

51001–51100 

|-bgcolor=#E9E9E9
| 51001 ||  || — || April 7, 2000 || Socorro || LINEAR || — || align=right | 8.6 km || 
|-id=002 bgcolor=#E9E9E9
| 51002 ||  || — || April 7, 2000 || Socorro || LINEAR || — || align=right | 6.8 km || 
|-id=003 bgcolor=#E9E9E9
| 51003 ||  || — || April 7, 2000 || Socorro || LINEAR || — || align=right | 2.5 km || 
|-id=004 bgcolor=#d6d6d6
| 51004 ||  || — || April 7, 2000 || Socorro || LINEAR || TEL || align=right | 4.2 km || 
|-id=005 bgcolor=#E9E9E9
| 51005 ||  || — || April 7, 2000 || Socorro || LINEAR || PAD || align=right | 5.3 km || 
|-id=006 bgcolor=#E9E9E9
| 51006 ||  || — || April 7, 2000 || Socorro || LINEAR || — || align=right | 3.6 km || 
|-id=007 bgcolor=#E9E9E9
| 51007 ||  || — || April 7, 2000 || Socorro || LINEAR || — || align=right | 8.3 km || 
|-id=008 bgcolor=#d6d6d6
| 51008 ||  || — || April 7, 2000 || Socorro || LINEAR || KOR || align=right | 4.4 km || 
|-id=009 bgcolor=#d6d6d6
| 51009 ||  || — || April 7, 2000 || Socorro || LINEAR || — || align=right | 8.4 km || 
|-id=010 bgcolor=#fefefe
| 51010 ||  || — || April 7, 2000 || Socorro || LINEAR || NYSslow || align=right | 1.8 km || 
|-id=011 bgcolor=#E9E9E9
| 51011 ||  || — || April 7, 2000 || Socorro || LINEAR || — || align=right | 3.5 km || 
|-id=012 bgcolor=#d6d6d6
| 51012 ||  || — || April 7, 2000 || Socorro || LINEAR || — || align=right | 8.7 km || 
|-id=013 bgcolor=#E9E9E9
| 51013 ||  || — || April 7, 2000 || Socorro || LINEAR || — || align=right | 5.1 km || 
|-id=014 bgcolor=#E9E9E9
| 51014 ||  || — || April 7, 2000 || Socorro || LINEAR || — || align=right | 5.9 km || 
|-id=015 bgcolor=#E9E9E9
| 51015 ||  || — || April 7, 2000 || Socorro || LINEAR || — || align=right | 4.0 km || 
|-id=016 bgcolor=#d6d6d6
| 51016 ||  || — || April 7, 2000 || Socorro || LINEAR || URS || align=right | 12 km || 
|-id=017 bgcolor=#E9E9E9
| 51017 ||  || — || April 7, 2000 || Socorro || LINEAR || — || align=right | 3.9 km || 
|-id=018 bgcolor=#d6d6d6
| 51018 ||  || — || April 7, 2000 || Socorro || LINEAR || URS || align=right | 10 km || 
|-id=019 bgcolor=#E9E9E9
| 51019 ||  || — || April 7, 2000 || Socorro || LINEAR || — || align=right | 4.7 km || 
|-id=020 bgcolor=#E9E9E9
| 51020 ||  || — || April 7, 2000 || Socorro || LINEAR || EUN || align=right | 4.9 km || 
|-id=021 bgcolor=#fefefe
| 51021 ||  || — || April 7, 2000 || Socorro || LINEAR || NYS || align=right | 1.9 km || 
|-id=022 bgcolor=#d6d6d6
| 51022 ||  || — || April 7, 2000 || Socorro || LINEAR || HYG || align=right | 9.7 km || 
|-id=023 bgcolor=#E9E9E9
| 51023 Benavidezlozano ||  ||  || April 2, 2000 || Anderson Mesa || LONEOS || — || align=right | 5.3 km || 
|-id=024 bgcolor=#E9E9E9
| 51024 ||  || — || April 2, 2000 || Anderson Mesa || LONEOS || — || align=right | 3.5 km || 
|-id=025 bgcolor=#E9E9E9
| 51025 ||  || — || April 2, 2000 || Anderson Mesa || LONEOS || — || align=right | 3.2 km || 
|-id=026 bgcolor=#d6d6d6
| 51026 ||  || — || April 3, 2000 || Anderson Mesa || LONEOS || — || align=right | 6.8 km || 
|-id=027 bgcolor=#E9E9E9
| 51027 ||  || — || April 3, 2000 || Anderson Mesa || LONEOS || — || align=right | 4.0 km || 
|-id=028 bgcolor=#E9E9E9
| 51028 ||  || — || April 7, 2000 || Socorro || LINEAR || — || align=right | 4.4 km || 
|-id=029 bgcolor=#d6d6d6
| 51029 ||  || — || April 7, 2000 || Socorro || LINEAR || — || align=right | 11 km || 
|-id=030 bgcolor=#E9E9E9
| 51030 ||  || — || April 8, 2000 || Socorro || LINEAR || — || align=right | 3.2 km || 
|-id=031 bgcolor=#fefefe
| 51031 ||  || — || April 8, 2000 || Socorro || LINEAR || — || align=right | 3.2 km || 
|-id=032 bgcolor=#E9E9E9
| 51032 ||  || — || April 3, 2000 || Kitt Peak || Spacewatch || HEN || align=right | 2.5 km || 
|-id=033 bgcolor=#E9E9E9
| 51033 ||  || — || April 6, 2000 || Kitt Peak || Spacewatch || DOR || align=right | 10 km || 
|-id=034 bgcolor=#E9E9E9
| 51034 ||  || — || April 7, 2000 || Socorro || LINEAR || HNS || align=right | 4.1 km || 
|-id=035 bgcolor=#d6d6d6
| 51035 ||  || — || April 7, 2000 || Socorro || LINEAR || — || align=right | 4.2 km || 
|-id=036 bgcolor=#d6d6d6
| 51036 ||  || — || April 7, 2000 || Socorro || LINEAR || — || align=right | 6.7 km || 
|-id=037 bgcolor=#d6d6d6
| 51037 ||  || — || April 6, 2000 || Kitt Peak || Spacewatch || EOS || align=right | 6.8 km || 
|-id=038 bgcolor=#E9E9E9
| 51038 ||  || — || April 8, 2000 || Socorro || LINEAR || BRU || align=right | 7.1 km || 
|-id=039 bgcolor=#d6d6d6
| 51039 ||  || — || April 12, 2000 || Haleakala || NEAT || EOS || align=right | 4.7 km || 
|-id=040 bgcolor=#E9E9E9
| 51040 ||  || — || April 7, 2000 || Socorro || LINEAR || — || align=right | 5.7 km || 
|-id=041 bgcolor=#d6d6d6
| 51041 ||  || — || April 7, 2000 || Socorro || LINEAR || — || align=right | 7.1 km || 
|-id=042 bgcolor=#fefefe
| 51042 ||  || — || April 8, 2000 || Socorro || LINEAR || — || align=right | 2.6 km || 
|-id=043 bgcolor=#d6d6d6
| 51043 ||  || — || April 8, 2000 || Socorro || LINEAR || — || align=right | 8.6 km || 
|-id=044 bgcolor=#E9E9E9
| 51044 ||  || — || April 8, 2000 || Socorro || LINEAR || MAR || align=right | 3.4 km || 
|-id=045 bgcolor=#E9E9E9
| 51045 ||  || — || April 8, 2000 || Socorro || LINEAR || — || align=right | 3.6 km || 
|-id=046 bgcolor=#E9E9E9
| 51046 ||  || — || April 12, 2000 || Socorro || LINEAR || — || align=right | 5.7 km || 
|-id=047 bgcolor=#E9E9E9
| 51047 ||  || — || April 12, 2000 || Socorro || LINEAR || — || align=right | 3.1 km || 
|-id=048 bgcolor=#d6d6d6
| 51048 ||  || — || April 12, 2000 || Socorro || LINEAR || — || align=right | 10 km || 
|-id=049 bgcolor=#E9E9E9
| 51049 ||  || — || April 12, 2000 || Socorro || LINEAR || — || align=right | 4.7 km || 
|-id=050 bgcolor=#d6d6d6
| 51050 ||  || — || April 12, 2000 || Socorro || LINEAR || — || align=right | 6.9 km || 
|-id=051 bgcolor=#d6d6d6
| 51051 ||  || — || April 8, 2000 || Socorro || LINEAR || ALA || align=right | 8.4 km || 
|-id=052 bgcolor=#d6d6d6
| 51052 ||  || — || April 8, 2000 || Socorro || LINEAR || TIR || align=right | 4.5 km || 
|-id=053 bgcolor=#E9E9E9
| 51053 ||  || — || April 4, 2000 || Anderson Mesa || LONEOS || ADE || align=right | 5.5 km || 
|-id=054 bgcolor=#E9E9E9
| 51054 ||  || — || April 4, 2000 || Anderson Mesa || LONEOS || — || align=right | 5.5 km || 
|-id=055 bgcolor=#E9E9E9
| 51055 ||  || — || April 4, 2000 || Anderson Mesa || LONEOS || — || align=right | 3.9 km || 
|-id=056 bgcolor=#E9E9E9
| 51056 ||  || — || April 4, 2000 || Anderson Mesa || LONEOS || — || align=right | 8.6 km || 
|-id=057 bgcolor=#E9E9E9
| 51057 ||  || — || April 4, 2000 || Anderson Mesa || LONEOS || — || align=right | 5.3 km || 
|-id=058 bgcolor=#d6d6d6
| 51058 ||  || — || April 7, 2000 || Anderson Mesa || LONEOS || LUT || align=right | 12 km || 
|-id=059 bgcolor=#d6d6d6
| 51059 ||  || — || April 7, 2000 || Anderson Mesa || LONEOS || — || align=right | 6.6 km || 
|-id=060 bgcolor=#E9E9E9
| 51060 ||  || — || April 7, 2000 || Anderson Mesa || LONEOS || — || align=right | 3.2 km || 
|-id=061 bgcolor=#d6d6d6
| 51061 ||  || — || April 7, 2000 || Anderson Mesa || LONEOS || ALA || align=right | 9.9 km || 
|-id=062 bgcolor=#d6d6d6
| 51062 ||  || — || April 7, 2000 || Anderson Mesa || LONEOS || EOS || align=right | 5.4 km || 
|-id=063 bgcolor=#d6d6d6
| 51063 ||  || — || April 7, 2000 || Anderson Mesa || LONEOS || EOS || align=right | 5.3 km || 
|-id=064 bgcolor=#E9E9E9
| 51064 ||  || — || April 11, 2000 || Reedy Creek || J. Broughton || — || align=right | 2.9 km || 
|-id=065 bgcolor=#E9E9E9
| 51065 ||  || — || April 5, 2000 || Socorro || LINEAR || — || align=right | 4.6 km || 
|-id=066 bgcolor=#E9E9E9
| 51066 ||  || — || April 6, 2000 || Anderson Mesa || LONEOS || MAR || align=right | 3.1 km || 
|-id=067 bgcolor=#fefefe
| 51067 ||  || — || April 6, 2000 || Anderson Mesa || LONEOS || — || align=right | 2.0 km || 
|-id=068 bgcolor=#d6d6d6
| 51068 ||  || — || April 6, 2000 || Socorro || LINEAR || KAR || align=right | 3.5 km || 
|-id=069 bgcolor=#d6d6d6
| 51069 ||  || — || April 7, 2000 || Socorro || LINEAR || — || align=right | 5.4 km || 
|-id=070 bgcolor=#d6d6d6
| 51070 ||  || — || April 7, 2000 || Anderson Mesa || LONEOS || 7:4 || align=right | 8.3 km || 
|-id=071 bgcolor=#d6d6d6
| 51071 ||  || — || April 7, 2000 || Socorro || LINEAR || — || align=right | 10 km || 
|-id=072 bgcolor=#d6d6d6
| 51072 ||  || — || April 7, 2000 || Socorro || LINEAR || VER || align=right | 9.0 km || 
|-id=073 bgcolor=#E9E9E9
| 51073 ||  || — || April 7, 2000 || Socorro || LINEAR || — || align=right | 4.9 km || 
|-id=074 bgcolor=#d6d6d6
| 51074 ||  || — || April 7, 2000 || Anderson Mesa || LONEOS || — || align=right | 5.1 km || 
|-id=075 bgcolor=#FA8072
| 51075 ||  || — || April 7, 2000 || Socorro || LINEAR || fast? || align=right | 1.8 km || 
|-id=076 bgcolor=#E9E9E9
| 51076 ||  || — || April 8, 2000 || Socorro || LINEAR || — || align=right | 3.4 km || 
|-id=077 bgcolor=#E9E9E9
| 51077 ||  || — || April 11, 2000 || Haleakala || NEAT || — || align=right | 3.0 km || 
|-id=078 bgcolor=#d6d6d6
| 51078 ||  || — || April 12, 2000 || Socorro || LINEAR || — || align=right | 8.7 km || 
|-id=079 bgcolor=#d6d6d6
| 51079 ||  || — || April 5, 2000 || Socorro || LINEAR || — || align=right | 6.5 km || 
|-id=080 bgcolor=#fefefe
| 51080 ||  || — || April 4, 2000 || Anderson Mesa || LONEOS || — || align=right | 2.2 km || 
|-id=081 bgcolor=#d6d6d6
| 51081 ||  || — || April 4, 2000 || Anderson Mesa || LONEOS || EOS || align=right | 6.3 km || 
|-id=082 bgcolor=#E9E9E9
| 51082 ||  || — || April 4, 2000 || Anderson Mesa || LONEOS || — || align=right | 4.4 km || 
|-id=083 bgcolor=#E9E9E9
| 51083 ||  || — || April 5, 2000 || Anderson Mesa || LONEOS || — || align=right | 5.4 km || 
|-id=084 bgcolor=#E9E9E9
| 51084 ||  || — || April 5, 2000 || Anderson Mesa || LONEOS || — || align=right | 6.8 km || 
|-id=085 bgcolor=#E9E9E9
| 51085 ||  || — || April 2, 2000 || Anderson Mesa || LONEOS || — || align=right | 6.3 km || 
|-id=086 bgcolor=#d6d6d6
| 51086 ||  || — || April 2, 2000 || Socorro || LINEAR || ALA || align=right | 11 km || 
|-id=087 bgcolor=#E9E9E9
| 51087 ||  || — || April 3, 2000 || Kitt Peak || Spacewatch || AGN || align=right | 3.4 km || 
|-id=088 bgcolor=#E9E9E9
| 51088 ||  || — || April 3, 2000 || Kitt Peak || Spacewatch || — || align=right | 2.0 km || 
|-id=089 bgcolor=#d6d6d6
| 51089 ||  || — || April 2, 2000 || Anderson Mesa || LONEOS || KAR || align=right | 2.8 km || 
|-id=090 bgcolor=#E9E9E9
| 51090 ||  || — || April 5, 2000 || Anderson Mesa || LONEOS || — || align=right | 3.7 km || 
|-id=091 bgcolor=#E9E9E9
| 51091 ||  || — || April 3, 2000 || Kitt Peak || Spacewatch || EUN || align=right | 2.9 km || 
|-id=092 bgcolor=#E9E9E9
| 51092 || 2000 HH || — || April 23, 2000 || Kurohone || T. Kobayashi || — || align=right | 5.7 km || 
|-id=093 bgcolor=#E9E9E9
| 51093 ||  || — || April 25, 2000 || Kitt Peak || Spacewatch || — || align=right | 3.8 km || 
|-id=094 bgcolor=#d6d6d6
| 51094 ||  || — || April 27, 2000 || Kitt Peak || Spacewatch || — || align=right | 12 km || 
|-id=095 bgcolor=#d6d6d6
| 51095 ||  || — || April 24, 2000 || Kitt Peak || Spacewatch || KOR || align=right | 3.9 km || 
|-id=096 bgcolor=#d6d6d6
| 51096 ||  || — || April 27, 2000 || Socorro || LINEAR || — || align=right | 12 km || 
|-id=097 bgcolor=#d6d6d6
| 51097 ||  || — || April 27, 2000 || Socorro || LINEAR || KOR || align=right | 4.2 km || 
|-id=098 bgcolor=#d6d6d6
| 51098 ||  || — || April 27, 2000 || Socorro || LINEAR || — || align=right | 6.4 km || 
|-id=099 bgcolor=#d6d6d6
| 51099 ||  || — || April 27, 2000 || Socorro || LINEAR || EOS || align=right | 5.2 km || 
|-id=100 bgcolor=#d6d6d6
| 51100 ||  || — || April 27, 2000 || Socorro || LINEAR || — || align=right | 8.0 km || 
|}

51101–51200 

|-bgcolor=#d6d6d6
| 51101 ||  || — || April 27, 2000 || Socorro || LINEAR || THM || align=right | 7.2 km || 
|-id=102 bgcolor=#E9E9E9
| 51102 ||  || — || April 28, 2000 || Socorro || LINEAR || — || align=right | 5.5 km || 
|-id=103 bgcolor=#d6d6d6
| 51103 ||  || — || April 28, 2000 || Socorro || LINEAR || — || align=right | 13 km || 
|-id=104 bgcolor=#d6d6d6
| 51104 ||  || — || April 28, 2000 || Socorro || LINEAR || — || align=right | 6.1 km || 
|-id=105 bgcolor=#d6d6d6
| 51105 ||  || — || April 28, 2000 || Socorro || LINEAR || THM || align=right | 8.0 km || 
|-id=106 bgcolor=#d6d6d6
| 51106 ||  || — || April 27, 2000 || Socorro || LINEAR || — || align=right | 4.2 km || 
|-id=107 bgcolor=#d6d6d6
| 51107 ||  || — || April 24, 2000 || Kitt Peak || Spacewatch || HYG || align=right | 7.6 km || 
|-id=108 bgcolor=#d6d6d6
| 51108 ||  || — || April 29, 2000 || Socorro || LINEAR || KOR || align=right | 2.8 km || 
|-id=109 bgcolor=#E9E9E9
| 51109 ||  || — || April 24, 2000 || Anderson Mesa || LONEOS || — || align=right | 2.1 km || 
|-id=110 bgcolor=#E9E9E9
| 51110 ||  || — || April 24, 2000 || Anderson Mesa || LONEOS || PAD || align=right | 5.6 km || 
|-id=111 bgcolor=#d6d6d6
| 51111 ||  || — || April 24, 2000 || Anderson Mesa || LONEOS || — || align=right | 3.1 km || 
|-id=112 bgcolor=#fefefe
| 51112 ||  || — || April 28, 2000 || Socorro || LINEAR || H || align=right | 1.9 km || 
|-id=113 bgcolor=#d6d6d6
| 51113 ||  || — || April 30, 2000 || Socorro || LINEAR || EOS || align=right | 5.7 km || 
|-id=114 bgcolor=#d6d6d6
| 51114 ||  || — || April 27, 2000 || Socorro || LINEAR || — || align=right | 9.1 km || 
|-id=115 bgcolor=#d6d6d6
| 51115 ||  || — || April 28, 2000 || Socorro || LINEAR || — || align=right | 11 km || 
|-id=116 bgcolor=#d6d6d6
| 51116 ||  || — || April 29, 2000 || Socorro || LINEAR || ALA || align=right | 9.7 km || 
|-id=117 bgcolor=#d6d6d6
| 51117 ||  || — || April 29, 2000 || Socorro || LINEAR || THM || align=right | 6.8 km || 
|-id=118 bgcolor=#d6d6d6
| 51118 ||  || — || April 29, 2000 || Socorro || LINEAR || — || align=right | 17 km || 
|-id=119 bgcolor=#d6d6d6
| 51119 ||  || — || April 29, 2000 || Socorro || LINEAR || LUT || align=right | 12 km || 
|-id=120 bgcolor=#E9E9E9
| 51120 ||  || — || April 24, 2000 || Anderson Mesa || LONEOS || HEN || align=right | 3.3 km || 
|-id=121 bgcolor=#E9E9E9
| 51121 ||  || — || April 25, 2000 || Anderson Mesa || LONEOS || — || align=right | 2.7 km || 
|-id=122 bgcolor=#d6d6d6
| 51122 ||  || — || April 27, 2000 || Socorro || LINEAR || — || align=right | 9.1 km || 
|-id=123 bgcolor=#E9E9E9
| 51123 ||  || — || April 28, 2000 || Socorro || LINEAR || ADE || align=right | 7.8 km || 
|-id=124 bgcolor=#E9E9E9
| 51124 ||  || — || April 28, 2000 || Socorro || LINEAR || — || align=right | 4.7 km || 
|-id=125 bgcolor=#d6d6d6
| 51125 ||  || — || April 28, 2000 || Socorro || LINEAR || EOS || align=right | 4.8 km || 
|-id=126 bgcolor=#E9E9E9
| 51126 ||  || — || April 28, 2000 || Socorro || LINEAR || — || align=right | 4.0 km || 
|-id=127 bgcolor=#d6d6d6
| 51127 ||  || — || April 28, 2000 || Socorro || LINEAR || — || align=right | 4.3 km || 
|-id=128 bgcolor=#d6d6d6
| 51128 ||  || — || April 28, 2000 || Kitt Peak || Spacewatch || HYG || align=right | 5.9 km || 
|-id=129 bgcolor=#d6d6d6
| 51129 ||  || — || April 29, 2000 || Kitt Peak || Spacewatch || TEL || align=right | 4.6 km || 
|-id=130 bgcolor=#d6d6d6
| 51130 ||  || — || April 30, 2000 || Kitt Peak || Spacewatch || — || align=right | 5.3 km || 
|-id=131 bgcolor=#E9E9E9
| 51131 ||  || — || April 28, 2000 || Socorro || LINEAR || — || align=right | 5.3 km || 
|-id=132 bgcolor=#d6d6d6
| 51132 ||  || — || April 29, 2000 || Socorro || LINEAR || — || align=right | 4.3 km || 
|-id=133 bgcolor=#E9E9E9
| 51133 ||  || — || April 24, 2000 || Anderson Mesa || LONEOS || DOR || align=right | 4.7 km || 
|-id=134 bgcolor=#E9E9E9
| 51134 ||  || — || April 26, 2000 || Anderson Mesa || LONEOS || — || align=right | 5.4 km || 
|-id=135 bgcolor=#d6d6d6
| 51135 ||  || — || April 26, 2000 || Anderson Mesa || LONEOS || — || align=right | 11 km || 
|-id=136 bgcolor=#d6d6d6
| 51136 ||  || — || April 26, 2000 || Anderson Mesa || LONEOS || VER || align=right | 8.9 km || 
|-id=137 bgcolor=#fefefe
| 51137 ||  || — || April 26, 2000 || Anderson Mesa || LONEOS || — || align=right | 2.3 km || 
|-id=138 bgcolor=#d6d6d6
| 51138 ||  || — || April 26, 2000 || Anderson Mesa || LONEOS || EOS || align=right | 6.1 km || 
|-id=139 bgcolor=#d6d6d6
| 51139 ||  || — || April 26, 2000 || Anderson Mesa || LONEOS || — || align=right | 4.7 km || 
|-id=140 bgcolor=#d6d6d6
| 51140 ||  || — || April 26, 2000 || Anderson Mesa || LONEOS || — || align=right | 8.8 km || 
|-id=141 bgcolor=#d6d6d6
| 51141 ||  || — || April 29, 2000 || Socorro || LINEAR || — || align=right | 5.9 km || 
|-id=142 bgcolor=#E9E9E9
| 51142 ||  || — || April 29, 2000 || Socorro || LINEAR || PAD || align=right | 5.7 km || 
|-id=143 bgcolor=#d6d6d6
| 51143 ||  || — || April 29, 2000 || Socorro || LINEAR || THM || align=right | 9.3 km || 
|-id=144 bgcolor=#d6d6d6
| 51144 ||  || — || April 29, 2000 || Socorro || LINEAR || NAE || align=right | 6.9 km || 
|-id=145 bgcolor=#E9E9E9
| 51145 ||  || — || April 29, 2000 || Socorro || LINEAR || — || align=right | 3.8 km || 
|-id=146 bgcolor=#d6d6d6
| 51146 ||  || — || April 29, 2000 || Socorro || LINEAR || — || align=right | 6.5 km || 
|-id=147 bgcolor=#d6d6d6
| 51147 ||  || — || April 29, 2000 || Socorro || LINEAR || — || align=right | 3.1 km || 
|-id=148 bgcolor=#d6d6d6
| 51148 ||  || — || April 29, 2000 || Socorro || LINEAR || — || align=right | 7.1 km || 
|-id=149 bgcolor=#E9E9E9
| 51149 ||  || — || April 29, 2000 || Socorro || LINEAR || JUN || align=right | 8.3 km || 
|-id=150 bgcolor=#fefefe
| 51150 ||  || — || April 29, 2000 || Socorro || LINEAR || — || align=right | 4.4 km || 
|-id=151 bgcolor=#d6d6d6
| 51151 ||  || — || April 29, 2000 || Socorro || LINEAR || — || align=right | 10 km || 
|-id=152 bgcolor=#E9E9E9
| 51152 ||  || — || April 29, 2000 || Socorro || LINEAR || — || align=right | 6.4 km || 
|-id=153 bgcolor=#d6d6d6
| 51153 ||  || — || April 24, 2000 || Anderson Mesa || LONEOS || EOS || align=right | 3.8 km || 
|-id=154 bgcolor=#d6d6d6
| 51154 ||  || — || April 24, 2000 || Anderson Mesa || LONEOS || — || align=right | 6.5 km || 
|-id=155 bgcolor=#d6d6d6
| 51155 ||  || — || April 24, 2000 || Anderson Mesa || LONEOS || EOS || align=right | 5.8 km || 
|-id=156 bgcolor=#E9E9E9
| 51156 ||  || — || April 24, 2000 || Anderson Mesa || LONEOS || — || align=right | 9.2 km || 
|-id=157 bgcolor=#FA8072
| 51157 ||  || — || April 24, 2000 || Anderson Mesa || LONEOS || — || align=right | 2.0 km || 
|-id=158 bgcolor=#d6d6d6
| 51158 ||  || — || April 24, 2000 || Anderson Mesa || LONEOS || HYG || align=right | 8.2 km || 
|-id=159 bgcolor=#d6d6d6
| 51159 ||  || — || April 24, 2000 || Anderson Mesa || LONEOS || — || align=right | 8.9 km || 
|-id=160 bgcolor=#fefefe
| 51160 ||  || — || April 24, 2000 || Anderson Mesa || LONEOS || — || align=right | 3.1 km || 
|-id=161 bgcolor=#E9E9E9
| 51161 ||  || — || April 24, 2000 || Anderson Mesa || LONEOS || — || align=right | 3.6 km || 
|-id=162 bgcolor=#E9E9E9
| 51162 ||  || — || April 25, 2000 || Anderson Mesa || LONEOS || — || align=right | 3.8 km || 
|-id=163 bgcolor=#d6d6d6
| 51163 ||  || — || April 25, 2000 || Anderson Mesa || LONEOS || EOS || align=right | 5.7 km || 
|-id=164 bgcolor=#E9E9E9
| 51164 ||  || — || April 25, 2000 || Kvistaberg || UDAS || — || align=right | 3.1 km || 
|-id=165 bgcolor=#d6d6d6
| 51165 ||  || — || April 26, 2000 || Anderson Mesa || LONEOS || — || align=right | 6.6 km || 
|-id=166 bgcolor=#d6d6d6
| 51166 Huimanto ||  ||  || April 26, 2000 || Anderson Mesa || LONEOS || THM || align=right | 8.6 km || 
|-id=167 bgcolor=#E9E9E9
| 51167 ||  || — || April 26, 2000 || Anderson Mesa || LONEOS || — || align=right | 4.2 km || 
|-id=168 bgcolor=#E9E9E9
| 51168 ||  || — || April 26, 2000 || Anderson Mesa || LONEOS || — || align=right | 3.2 km || 
|-id=169 bgcolor=#d6d6d6
| 51169 ||  || — || April 26, 2000 || Anderson Mesa || LONEOS || — || align=right | 4.1 km || 
|-id=170 bgcolor=#E9E9E9
| 51170 ||  || — || April 26, 2000 || Anderson Mesa || LONEOS || — || align=right | 6.4 km || 
|-id=171 bgcolor=#E9E9E9
| 51171 ||  || — || April 27, 2000 || Anderson Mesa || LONEOS || — || align=right | 8.8 km || 
|-id=172 bgcolor=#E9E9E9
| 51172 ||  || — || April 27, 2000 || Anderson Mesa || LONEOS || — || align=right | 3.8 km || 
|-id=173 bgcolor=#E9E9E9
| 51173 ||  || — || April 24, 2000 || Anderson Mesa || LONEOS || — || align=right | 5.3 km || 
|-id=174 bgcolor=#d6d6d6
| 51174 ||  || — || April 24, 2000 || Anderson Mesa || LONEOS || EOS || align=right | 4.3 km || 
|-id=175 bgcolor=#E9E9E9
| 51175 ||  || — || April 26, 2000 || Anderson Mesa || LONEOS || — || align=right | 4.3 km || 
|-id=176 bgcolor=#E9E9E9
| 51176 ||  || — || April 26, 2000 || Anderson Mesa || LONEOS || — || align=right | 5.7 km || 
|-id=177 bgcolor=#d6d6d6
| 51177 ||  || — || April 26, 2000 || Anderson Mesa || LONEOS || — || align=right | 9.0 km || 
|-id=178 bgcolor=#d6d6d6
| 51178 Geraintjones ||  ||  || April 26, 2000 || Anderson Mesa || LONEOS || HIL3:2 || align=right | 19 km || 
|-id=179 bgcolor=#E9E9E9
| 51179 ||  || — || April 24, 2000 || Anderson Mesa || LONEOS || — || align=right | 7.5 km || 
|-id=180 bgcolor=#E9E9E9
| 51180 ||  || — || April 27, 2000 || Anderson Mesa || LONEOS || EUN || align=right | 3.2 km || 
|-id=181 bgcolor=#d6d6d6
| 51181 ||  || — || April 27, 2000 || Socorro || LINEAR || — || align=right | 7.0 km || 
|-id=182 bgcolor=#E9E9E9
| 51182 ||  || — || April 27, 2000 || Socorro || LINEAR || — || align=right | 8.1 km || 
|-id=183 bgcolor=#E9E9E9
| 51183 ||  || — || April 27, 2000 || Socorro || LINEAR || — || align=right | 3.8 km || 
|-id=184 bgcolor=#d6d6d6
| 51184 ||  || — || April 28, 2000 || Socorro || LINEAR || — || align=right | 6.1 km || 
|-id=185 bgcolor=#d6d6d6
| 51185 ||  || — || April 30, 2000 || Anderson Mesa || LONEOS || VER || align=right | 7.0 km || 
|-id=186 bgcolor=#E9E9E9
| 51186 ||  || — || April 30, 2000 || Anderson Mesa || LONEOS || ADE || align=right | 6.8 km || 
|-id=187 bgcolor=#E9E9E9
| 51187 ||  || — || April 28, 2000 || Socorro || LINEAR || BRG || align=right | 5.3 km || 
|-id=188 bgcolor=#d6d6d6
| 51188 ||  || — || April 29, 2000 || Socorro || LINEAR || EOS || align=right | 6.0 km || 
|-id=189 bgcolor=#E9E9E9
| 51189 ||  || — || April 30, 2000 || Anderson Mesa || LONEOS || — || align=right | 8.9 km || 
|-id=190 bgcolor=#E9E9E9
| 51190 ||  || — || April 29, 2000 || Anderson Mesa || LONEOS || — || align=right | 3.8 km || 
|-id=191 bgcolor=#E9E9E9
| 51191 ||  || — || April 29, 2000 || Socorro || LINEAR || — || align=right | 5.1 km || 
|-id=192 bgcolor=#d6d6d6
| 51192 ||  || — || April 28, 2000 || Socorro || LINEAR || — || align=right | 11 km || 
|-id=193 bgcolor=#d6d6d6
| 51193 ||  || — || April 30, 2000 || Anderson Mesa || LONEOS || — || align=right | 4.2 km || 
|-id=194 bgcolor=#d6d6d6
| 51194 ||  || — || April 27, 2000 || Anderson Mesa || LONEOS || EOS || align=right | 3.8 km || 
|-id=195 bgcolor=#d6d6d6
| 51195 ||  || — || April 27, 2000 || Anderson Mesa || LONEOS || — || align=right | 7.0 km || 
|-id=196 bgcolor=#E9E9E9
| 51196 ||  || — || April 26, 2000 || Anderson Mesa || LONEOS || — || align=right | 2.9 km || 
|-id=197 bgcolor=#E9E9E9
| 51197 || 2000 JJ || — || May 1, 2000 || Socorro || LINEAR || MAR || align=right | 5.1 km || 
|-id=198 bgcolor=#fefefe
| 51198 ||  || — || May 4, 2000 || Socorro || LINEAR || PHO || align=right | 2.5 km || 
|-id=199 bgcolor=#d6d6d6
| 51199 ||  || — || May 4, 2000 || Kleť || Kleť Obs. || 7:4 || align=right | 7.6 km || 
|-id=200 bgcolor=#d6d6d6
| 51200 ||  || — || May 1, 2000 || Socorro || LINEAR || — || align=right | 5.1 km || 
|}

51201–51300 

|-bgcolor=#E9E9E9
| 51201 ||  || — || May 3, 2000 || Socorro || LINEAR || EUN || align=right | 3.2 km || 
|-id=202 bgcolor=#d6d6d6
| 51202 ||  || — || May 4, 2000 || Socorro || LINEAR || — || align=right | 9.3 km || 
|-id=203 bgcolor=#E9E9E9
| 51203 ||  || — || May 5, 2000 || Kitt Peak || Spacewatch || — || align=right | 3.2 km || 
|-id=204 bgcolor=#E9E9E9
| 51204 ||  || — || May 3, 2000 || Socorro || LINEAR || — || align=right | 3.5 km || 
|-id=205 bgcolor=#E9E9E9
| 51205 ||  || — || May 4, 2000 || Socorro || LINEAR || — || align=right | 4.3 km || 
|-id=206 bgcolor=#E9E9E9
| 51206 ||  || — || May 3, 2000 || Socorro || LINEAR || — || align=right | 3.9 km || 
|-id=207 bgcolor=#E9E9E9
| 51207 ||  || — || May 3, 2000 || Socorro || LINEAR || EUN || align=right | 4.8 km || 
|-id=208 bgcolor=#E9E9E9
| 51208 ||  || — || May 6, 2000 || Socorro || LINEAR || — || align=right | 6.6 km || 
|-id=209 bgcolor=#d6d6d6
| 51209 ||  || — || May 6, 2000 || Socorro || LINEAR || — || align=right | 9.7 km || 
|-id=210 bgcolor=#d6d6d6
| 51210 ||  || — || May 5, 2000 || Socorro || LINEAR || HYG || align=right | 8.5 km || 
|-id=211 bgcolor=#E9E9E9
| 51211 ||  || — || May 6, 2000 || Socorro || LINEAR || — || align=right | 4.4 km || 
|-id=212 bgcolor=#E9E9E9
| 51212 ||  || — || May 6, 2000 || Socorro || LINEAR || — || align=right | 3.7 km || 
|-id=213 bgcolor=#d6d6d6
| 51213 ||  || — || May 6, 2000 || Socorro || LINEAR || — || align=right | 7.6 km || 
|-id=214 bgcolor=#d6d6d6
| 51214 ||  || — || May 6, 2000 || Socorro || LINEAR || HYG || align=right | 10 km || 
|-id=215 bgcolor=#d6d6d6
| 51215 ||  || — || May 6, 2000 || Socorro || LINEAR || — || align=right | 6.7 km || 
|-id=216 bgcolor=#d6d6d6
| 51216 ||  || — || May 7, 2000 || Socorro || LINEAR || ITH || align=right | 7.1 km || 
|-id=217 bgcolor=#fefefe
| 51217 ||  || — || May 7, 2000 || Socorro || LINEAR || — || align=right | 4.5 km || 
|-id=218 bgcolor=#d6d6d6
| 51218 ||  || — || May 7, 2000 || Socorro || LINEAR || EOS || align=right | 7.3 km || 
|-id=219 bgcolor=#E9E9E9
| 51219 ||  || — || May 7, 2000 || Socorro || LINEAR || — || align=right | 6.5 km || 
|-id=220 bgcolor=#E9E9E9
| 51220 ||  || — || May 7, 2000 || Socorro || LINEAR || EUNslow? || align=right | 3.2 km || 
|-id=221 bgcolor=#E9E9E9
| 51221 ||  || — || May 7, 2000 || Socorro || LINEAR || — || align=right | 3.4 km || 
|-id=222 bgcolor=#d6d6d6
| 51222 ||  || — || May 7, 2000 || Socorro || LINEAR || — || align=right | 6.4 km || 
|-id=223 bgcolor=#fefefe
| 51223 ||  || — || May 7, 2000 || Socorro || LINEAR || — || align=right | 2.9 km || 
|-id=224 bgcolor=#d6d6d6
| 51224 ||  || — || May 7, 2000 || Socorro || LINEAR || — || align=right | 6.6 km || 
|-id=225 bgcolor=#E9E9E9
| 51225 ||  || — || May 7, 2000 || Socorro || LINEAR || — || align=right | 4.7 km || 
|-id=226 bgcolor=#E9E9E9
| 51226 ||  || — || May 7, 2000 || Socorro || LINEAR || — || align=right | 4.7 km || 
|-id=227 bgcolor=#d6d6d6
| 51227 ||  || — || May 7, 2000 || Socorro || LINEAR || — || align=right | 9.1 km || 
|-id=228 bgcolor=#fefefe
| 51228 ||  || — || May 7, 2000 || Socorro || LINEAR || — || align=right | 3.9 km || 
|-id=229 bgcolor=#d6d6d6
| 51229 ||  || — || May 7, 2000 || Socorro || LINEAR || LIX || align=right | 12 km || 
|-id=230 bgcolor=#d6d6d6
| 51230 ||  || — || May 7, 2000 || Socorro || LINEAR || — || align=right | 8.8 km || 
|-id=231 bgcolor=#d6d6d6
| 51231 ||  || — || May 7, 2000 || Socorro || LINEAR || — || align=right | 6.7 km || 
|-id=232 bgcolor=#d6d6d6
| 51232 ||  || — || May 7, 2000 || Socorro || LINEAR || EOS || align=right | 5.1 km || 
|-id=233 bgcolor=#d6d6d6
| 51233 ||  || — || May 7, 2000 || Socorro || LINEAR || ALA || align=right | 11 km || 
|-id=234 bgcolor=#d6d6d6
| 51234 ||  || — || May 7, 2000 || Socorro || LINEAR || EOS || align=right | 5.4 km || 
|-id=235 bgcolor=#E9E9E9
| 51235 ||  || — || May 7, 2000 || Socorro || LINEAR || — || align=right | 7.0 km || 
|-id=236 bgcolor=#d6d6d6
| 51236 ||  || — || May 7, 2000 || Socorro || LINEAR || — || align=right | 9.4 km || 
|-id=237 bgcolor=#d6d6d6
| 51237 ||  || — || May 7, 2000 || Socorro || LINEAR || — || align=right | 7.9 km || 
|-id=238 bgcolor=#d6d6d6
| 51238 ||  || — || May 7, 2000 || Socorro || LINEAR || slow || align=right | 12 km || 
|-id=239 bgcolor=#E9E9E9
| 51239 ||  || — || May 7, 2000 || Socorro || LINEAR || — || align=right | 4.2 km || 
|-id=240 bgcolor=#d6d6d6
| 51240 ||  || — || May 7, 2000 || Socorro || LINEAR || THM || align=right | 9.5 km || 
|-id=241 bgcolor=#d6d6d6
| 51241 ||  || — || May 7, 2000 || Socorro || LINEAR || HYG || align=right | 9.2 km || 
|-id=242 bgcolor=#E9E9E9
| 51242 ||  || — || May 7, 2000 || Socorro || LINEAR || EUN || align=right | 3.3 km || 
|-id=243 bgcolor=#d6d6d6
| 51243 ||  || — || May 7, 2000 || Socorro || LINEAR || HYG || align=right | 6.3 km || 
|-id=244 bgcolor=#d6d6d6
| 51244 ||  || — || May 7, 2000 || Socorro || LINEAR || EOS || align=right | 8.8 km || 
|-id=245 bgcolor=#E9E9E9
| 51245 ||  || — || May 6, 2000 || Socorro || LINEAR || — || align=right | 4.9 km || 
|-id=246 bgcolor=#E9E9E9
| 51246 ||  || — || May 7, 2000 || Socorro || LINEAR || GEF || align=right | 3.1 km || 
|-id=247 bgcolor=#d6d6d6
| 51247 ||  || — || May 7, 2000 || Socorro || LINEAR || — || align=right | 3.7 km || 
|-id=248 bgcolor=#d6d6d6
| 51248 ||  || — || May 7, 2000 || Socorro || LINEAR || EOS || align=right | 5.9 km || 
|-id=249 bgcolor=#d6d6d6
| 51249 ||  || — || May 9, 2000 || Socorro || LINEAR || EOS || align=right | 4.7 km || 
|-id=250 bgcolor=#d6d6d6
| 51250 ||  || — || May 9, 2000 || Socorro || LINEAR || — || align=right | 12 km || 
|-id=251 bgcolor=#d6d6d6
| 51251 ||  || — || May 9, 2000 || Socorro || LINEAR || — || align=right | 5.1 km || 
|-id=252 bgcolor=#d6d6d6
| 51252 ||  || — || May 9, 2000 || Socorro || LINEAR || — || align=right | 6.7 km || 
|-id=253 bgcolor=#E9E9E9
| 51253 ||  || — || May 6, 2000 || Socorro || LINEAR || — || align=right | 3.9 km || 
|-id=254 bgcolor=#d6d6d6
| 51254 ||  || — || May 6, 2000 || Socorro || LINEAR || — || align=right | 12 km || 
|-id=255 bgcolor=#d6d6d6
| 51255 ||  || — || May 6, 2000 || Socorro || LINEAR || FIR || align=right | 11 km || 
|-id=256 bgcolor=#E9E9E9
| 51256 ||  || — || May 6, 2000 || Socorro || LINEAR || — || align=right | 6.7 km || 
|-id=257 bgcolor=#d6d6d6
| 51257 ||  || — || May 7, 2000 || Socorro || LINEAR || EOS || align=right | 6.0 km || 
|-id=258 bgcolor=#E9E9E9
| 51258 ||  || — || May 7, 2000 || Socorro || LINEAR || — || align=right | 9.8 km || 
|-id=259 bgcolor=#d6d6d6
| 51259 ||  || — || May 7, 2000 || Socorro || LINEAR || SAN || align=right | 4.7 km || 
|-id=260 bgcolor=#d6d6d6
| 51260 ||  || — || May 9, 2000 || Socorro || LINEAR || EOS || align=right | 7.6 km || 
|-id=261 bgcolor=#E9E9E9
| 51261 Holuša ||  ||  || May 13, 2000 || Ondřejov || L. Kotková || — || align=right | 4.8 km || 
|-id=262 bgcolor=#E9E9E9
| 51262 ||  || — || May 1, 2000 || Anderson Mesa || LONEOS || EUN || align=right | 6.3 km || 
|-id=263 bgcolor=#d6d6d6
| 51263 ||  || — || May 1, 2000 || Anderson Mesa || LONEOS || — || align=right | 13 km || 
|-id=264 bgcolor=#E9E9E9
| 51264 ||  || — || May 1, 2000 || Anderson Mesa || LONEOS || — || align=right | 8.5 km || 
|-id=265 bgcolor=#fefefe
| 51265 ||  || — || May 1, 2000 || Anderson Mesa || LONEOS || — || align=right | 4.1 km || 
|-id=266 bgcolor=#E9E9E9
| 51266 ||  || — || May 1, 2000 || Anderson Mesa || LONEOS || — || align=right | 7.2 km || 
|-id=267 bgcolor=#d6d6d6
| 51267 ||  || — || May 1, 2000 || Kitt Peak || Spacewatch || — || align=right | 7.1 km || 
|-id=268 bgcolor=#E9E9E9
| 51268 ||  || — || May 1, 2000 || Haleakala || NEAT || GEF || align=right | 3.7 km || 
|-id=269 bgcolor=#E9E9E9
| 51269 ||  || — || May 2, 2000 || Anderson Mesa || LONEOS || — || align=right | 6.5 km || 
|-id=270 bgcolor=#E9E9E9
| 51270 ||  || — || May 2, 2000 || Haleakala || NEAT || — || align=right | 3.2 km || 
|-id=271 bgcolor=#E9E9E9
| 51271 ||  || — || May 4, 2000 || Anderson Mesa || LONEOS || — || align=right | 5.9 km || 
|-id=272 bgcolor=#E9E9E9
| 51272 ||  || — || May 4, 2000 || Anderson Mesa || LONEOS || — || align=right | 3.6 km || 
|-id=273 bgcolor=#d6d6d6
| 51273 ||  || — || May 4, 2000 || Kitt Peak || Spacewatch || — || align=right | 7.1 km || 
|-id=274 bgcolor=#d6d6d6
| 51274 ||  || — || May 9, 2000 || Socorro || LINEAR || — || align=right | 5.9 km || 
|-id=275 bgcolor=#d6d6d6
| 51275 ||  || — || May 4, 2000 || Socorro || LINEAR || — || align=right | 4.4 km || 
|-id=276 bgcolor=#E9E9E9
| 51276 ||  || — || May 7, 2000 || Anderson Mesa || LONEOS || EUN || align=right | 4.2 km || 
|-id=277 bgcolor=#d6d6d6
| 51277 ||  || — || May 7, 2000 || Socorro || LINEAR || — || align=right | 8.1 km || 
|-id=278 bgcolor=#d6d6d6
| 51278 ||  || — || May 5, 2000 || Socorro || LINEAR || — || align=right | 3.8 km || 
|-id=279 bgcolor=#d6d6d6
| 51279 ||  || — || May 5, 2000 || Socorro || LINEAR || TIR || align=right | 7.7 km || 
|-id=280 bgcolor=#d6d6d6
| 51280 ||  || — || May 24, 2000 || Tebbutt || F. B. Zoltowski || — || align=right | 5.8 km || 
|-id=281 bgcolor=#d6d6d6
| 51281 ||  || — || May 27, 2000 || Socorro || LINEAR || EOS || align=right | 5.8 km || 
|-id=282 bgcolor=#d6d6d6
| 51282 ||  || — || May 27, 2000 || Socorro || LINEAR || EOS || align=right | 7.1 km || 
|-id=283 bgcolor=#d6d6d6
| 51283 ||  || — || May 27, 2000 || Socorro || LINEAR || — || align=right | 5.9 km || 
|-id=284 bgcolor=#d6d6d6
| 51284 ||  || — || May 28, 2000 || Socorro || LINEAR || 3:2 || align=right | 8.6 km || 
|-id=285 bgcolor=#E9E9E9
| 51285 ||  || — || May 28, 2000 || Socorro || LINEAR || — || align=right | 4.7 km || 
|-id=286 bgcolor=#d6d6d6
| 51286 ||  || — || May 28, 2000 || Socorro || LINEAR || — || align=right | 11 km || 
|-id=287 bgcolor=#d6d6d6
| 51287 ||  || — || May 28, 2000 || Socorro || LINEAR || — || align=right | 7.3 km || 
|-id=288 bgcolor=#d6d6d6
| 51288 ||  || — || May 28, 2000 || Socorro || LINEAR || THM || align=right | 5.8 km || 
|-id=289 bgcolor=#d6d6d6
| 51289 ||  || — || May 28, 2000 || Socorro || LINEAR || — || align=right | 10 km || 
|-id=290 bgcolor=#d6d6d6
| 51290 ||  || — || May 28, 2000 || Socorro || LINEAR || THM || align=right | 8.0 km || 
|-id=291 bgcolor=#d6d6d6
| 51291 ||  || — || May 28, 2000 || Socorro || LINEAR || Tj (2.99) || align=right | 21 km || 
|-id=292 bgcolor=#d6d6d6
| 51292 ||  || — || May 28, 2000 || Socorro || LINEAR || KOR || align=right | 4.8 km || 
|-id=293 bgcolor=#d6d6d6
| 51293 ||  || — || May 28, 2000 || Socorro || LINEAR || EOS || align=right | 6.2 km || 
|-id=294 bgcolor=#E9E9E9
| 51294 ||  || — || May 28, 2000 || Socorro || LINEAR || — || align=right | 3.2 km || 
|-id=295 bgcolor=#E9E9E9
| 51295 ||  || — || May 27, 2000 || Socorro || LINEAR || — || align=right | 3.4 km || 
|-id=296 bgcolor=#d6d6d6
| 51296 ||  || — || May 29, 2000 || Socorro || LINEAR || — || align=right | 3.7 km || 
|-id=297 bgcolor=#d6d6d6
| 51297 ||  || — || May 30, 2000 || Kitt Peak || Spacewatch || — || align=right | 12 km || 
|-id=298 bgcolor=#d6d6d6
| 51298 ||  || — || May 23, 2000 || Anderson Mesa || LONEOS || 3:2 || align=right | 15 km || 
|-id=299 bgcolor=#d6d6d6
| 51299 ||  || — || May 23, 2000 || Anderson Mesa || LONEOS || — || align=right | 5.8 km || 
|-id=300 bgcolor=#E9E9E9
| 51300 ||  || — || May 24, 2000 || Anderson Mesa || LONEOS || — || align=right | 6.0 km || 
|}

51301–51400 

|-bgcolor=#d6d6d6
| 51301 ||  || — || May 27, 2000 || Socorro || LINEAR || EOS || align=right | 6.0 km || 
|-id=302 bgcolor=#E9E9E9
| 51302 ||  || — || May 27, 2000 || Socorro || LINEAR || EUN || align=right | 4.7 km || 
|-id=303 bgcolor=#d6d6d6
| 51303 ||  || — || May 27, 2000 || Socorro || LINEAR || EOS || align=right | 6.9 km || 
|-id=304 bgcolor=#E9E9E9
| 51304 ||  || — || May 24, 2000 || Anderson Mesa || LONEOS || — || align=right | 5.9 km || 
|-id=305 bgcolor=#d6d6d6
| 51305 ||  || — || May 24, 2000 || Anderson Mesa || LONEOS || EOS || align=right | 6.7 km || 
|-id=306 bgcolor=#d6d6d6
| 51306 ||  || — || May 25, 2000 || Anderson Mesa || LONEOS || — || align=right | 7.6 km || 
|-id=307 bgcolor=#d6d6d6
| 51307 ||  || — || May 25, 2000 || Anderson Mesa || LONEOS || — || align=right | 5.8 km || 
|-id=308 bgcolor=#E9E9E9
| 51308 ||  || — || May 26, 2000 || Anderson Mesa || LONEOS || EUN || align=right | 3.9 km || 
|-id=309 bgcolor=#d6d6d6
| 51309 ||  || — || May 26, 2000 || Anderson Mesa || LONEOS || 7:4 || align=right | 11 km || 
|-id=310 bgcolor=#d6d6d6
| 51310 ||  || — || May 26, 2000 || Anderson Mesa || LONEOS || EOS || align=right | 5.1 km || 
|-id=311 bgcolor=#d6d6d6
| 51311 ||  || — || May 27, 2000 || Socorro || LINEAR || EOS || align=right | 5.3 km || 
|-id=312 bgcolor=#d6d6d6
| 51312 ||  || — || May 27, 2000 || Socorro || LINEAR || — || align=right | 5.2 km || 
|-id=313 bgcolor=#E9E9E9
| 51313 ||  || — || May 28, 2000 || Socorro || LINEAR || — || align=right | 3.7 km || 
|-id=314 bgcolor=#d6d6d6
| 51314 ||  || — || May 27, 2000 || Socorro || LINEAR || — || align=right | 10 km || 
|-id=315 bgcolor=#E9E9E9
| 51315 ||  || — || May 27, 2000 || Socorro || LINEAR || — || align=right | 4.3 km || 
|-id=316 bgcolor=#d6d6d6
| 51316 ||  || — || May 27, 2000 || Socorro || LINEAR || EOS || align=right | 4.7 km || 
|-id=317 bgcolor=#d6d6d6
| 51317 ||  || — || May 27, 2000 || Socorro || LINEAR || — || align=right | 7.9 km || 
|-id=318 bgcolor=#d6d6d6
| 51318 ||  || — || May 27, 2000 || Socorro || LINEAR || EOS || align=right | 6.3 km || 
|-id=319 bgcolor=#d6d6d6
| 51319 ||  || — || May 27, 2000 || Socorro || LINEAR || — || align=right | 12 km || 
|-id=320 bgcolor=#d6d6d6
| 51320 ||  || — || May 25, 2000 || Anderson Mesa || LONEOS || HYG || align=right | 8.0 km || 
|-id=321 bgcolor=#E9E9E9
| 51321 ||  || — || June 1, 2000 || Bergisch Gladbach || W. Bickel || MAR || align=right | 3.3 km || 
|-id=322 bgcolor=#d6d6d6
| 51322 ||  || — || June 6, 2000 || Reedy Creek || J. Broughton || HYG || align=right | 6.3 km || 
|-id=323 bgcolor=#E9E9E9
| 51323 ||  || — || June 4, 2000 || Ondřejov || L. Kotková || — || align=right | 6.4 km || 
|-id=324 bgcolor=#d6d6d6
| 51324 ||  || — || June 5, 2000 || Socorro || LINEAR || — || align=right | 15 km || 
|-id=325 bgcolor=#d6d6d6
| 51325 ||  || — || June 4, 2000 || Socorro || LINEAR || — || align=right | 5.9 km || 
|-id=326 bgcolor=#d6d6d6
| 51326 ||  || — || June 4, 2000 || Socorro || LINEAR || EOS || align=right | 6.9 km || 
|-id=327 bgcolor=#d6d6d6
| 51327 ||  || — || June 8, 2000 || Socorro || LINEAR || — || align=right | 21 km || 
|-id=328 bgcolor=#d6d6d6
| 51328 ||  || — || June 8, 2000 || Socorro || LINEAR || — || align=right | 14 km || 
|-id=329 bgcolor=#d6d6d6
| 51329 ||  || — || June 4, 2000 || Socorro || LINEAR || — || align=right | 9.2 km || 
|-id=330 bgcolor=#d6d6d6
| 51330 ||  || — || June 4, 2000 || Haleakala || NEAT || — || align=right | 7.0 km || 
|-id=331 bgcolor=#d6d6d6
| 51331 ||  || — || June 1, 2000 || Haleakala || NEAT || EOS || align=right | 5.0 km || 
|-id=332 bgcolor=#d6d6d6
| 51332 ||  || — || June 1, 2000 || Anderson Mesa || LONEOS || — || align=right | 14 km || 
|-id=333 bgcolor=#d6d6d6
| 51333 || 2000 ME || — || June 22, 2000 || Reedy Creek || J. Broughton || — || align=right | 4.6 km || 
|-id=334 bgcolor=#d6d6d6
| 51334 ||  || — || July 4, 2000 || Anderson Mesa || LONEOS || EMA || align=right | 8.4 km || 
|-id=335 bgcolor=#fefefe
| 51335 ||  || — || July 4, 2000 || Anderson Mesa || LONEOS || — || align=right | 2.5 km || 
|-id=336 bgcolor=#d6d6d6
| 51336 ||  || — || July 4, 2000 || Anderson Mesa || LONEOS || VER || align=right | 9.8 km || 
|-id=337 bgcolor=#fefefe
| 51337 ||  || — || July 23, 2000 || Socorro || LINEAR || — || align=right | 2.0 km || 
|-id=338 bgcolor=#d6d6d6
| 51338 ||  || — || July 23, 2000 || Socorro || LINEAR || — || align=right | 11 km || 
|-id=339 bgcolor=#C2FFFF
| 51339 ||  || — || July 28, 2000 || OCA-Anza || OCA-Anza || L5 || align=right | 19 km || 
|-id=340 bgcolor=#C2FFFF
| 51340 ||  || — || August 24, 2000 || Socorro || LINEAR || L5 || align=right | 23 km || 
|-id=341 bgcolor=#E9E9E9
| 51341 ||  || — || August 23, 2000 || Nachi-Katsuura || Y. Shimizu, T. Urata || — || align=right | 3.5 km || 
|-id=342 bgcolor=#E9E9E9
| 51342 ||  || — || August 24, 2000 || Socorro || LINEAR || — || align=right | 4.6 km || 
|-id=343 bgcolor=#fefefe
| 51343 ||  || — || August 24, 2000 || Socorro || LINEAR || — || align=right | 2.1 km || 
|-id=344 bgcolor=#C2FFFF
| 51344 ||  || — || August 24, 2000 || Socorro || LINEAR || L5 || align=right | 18 km || 
|-id=345 bgcolor=#C2FFFF
| 51345 ||  || — || August 31, 2000 || Socorro || LINEAR || L5 || align=right | 24 km || 
|-id=346 bgcolor=#C2FFFF
| 51346 ||  || — || August 31, 2000 || Socorro || LINEAR || L5 || align=right | 21 km || 
|-id=347 bgcolor=#C2FFFF
| 51347 ||  || — || August 31, 2000 || Socorro || LINEAR || L5 || align=right | 23 km || 
|-id=348 bgcolor=#C2FFFF
| 51348 ||  || — || August 31, 2000 || Socorro || LINEAR || L5 || align=right | 18 km || 
|-id=349 bgcolor=#d6d6d6
| 51349 ||  || — || August 31, 2000 || Socorro || LINEAR || 3:2 || align=right | 14 km || 
|-id=350 bgcolor=#C2FFFF
| 51350 ||  || — || August 31, 2000 || Socorro || LINEAR || L5 || align=right | 27 km || 
|-id=351 bgcolor=#C2FFFF
| 51351 ||  || — || August 20, 2000 || Kitt Peak || Spacewatch || L5 || align=right | 19 km || 
|-id=352 bgcolor=#fefefe
| 51352 ||  || — || September 1, 2000 || Socorro || LINEAR || FLO || align=right | 2.1 km || 
|-id=353 bgcolor=#E9E9E9
| 51353 ||  || — || September 1, 2000 || Socorro || LINEAR || — || align=right | 4.4 km || 
|-id=354 bgcolor=#C2FFFF
| 51354 ||  || — || September 1, 2000 || Socorro || LINEAR || L5 || align=right | 29 km || 
|-id=355 bgcolor=#fefefe
| 51355 ||  || — || September 5, 2000 || Socorro || LINEAR || — || align=right | 2.9 km || 
|-id=356 bgcolor=#FA8072
| 51356 ||  || — || September 8, 2000 || Socorro || LINEAR || Hmoon || align=right | 2.6 km || 
|-id=357 bgcolor=#C2FFFF
| 51357 ||  || — || September 3, 2000 || Socorro || LINEAR || L5 || align=right | 19 km || 
|-id=358 bgcolor=#E9E9E9
| 51358 ||  || — || September 21, 2000 || Socorro || LINEAR || MAR || align=right | 3.8 km || 
|-id=359 bgcolor=#C2FFFF
| 51359 ||  || — || September 23, 2000 || Socorro || LINEAR || L5 || align=right | 23 km || 
|-id=360 bgcolor=#C2FFFF
| 51360 ||  || — || September 23, 2000 || Socorro || LINEAR || L5 || align=right | 21 km || 
|-id=361 bgcolor=#d6d6d6
| 51361 ||  || — || September 24, 2000 || Socorro || LINEAR || — || align=right | 8.9 km || 
|-id=362 bgcolor=#C2FFFF
| 51362 ||  || — || September 24, 2000 || Socorro || LINEAR || L5 || align=right | 18 km || 
|-id=363 bgcolor=#E9E9E9
| 51363 ||  || — || September 26, 2000 || Socorro || LINEAR || — || align=right | 3.1 km || 
|-id=364 bgcolor=#C2FFFF
| 51364 ||  || — || September 26, 2000 || Haleakala || NEAT || L5 || align=right | 28 km || 
|-id=365 bgcolor=#C2FFFF
| 51365 ||  || — || October 1, 2000 || Socorro || LINEAR || L5 || align=right | 41 km || 
|-id=366 bgcolor=#fefefe
| 51366 ||  || — || October 31, 2000 || Socorro || LINEAR || — || align=right | 1.8 km || 
|-id=367 bgcolor=#fefefe
| 51367 ||  || — || October 25, 2000 || Socorro || LINEAR || — || align=right | 3.0 km || 
|-id=368 bgcolor=#fefefe
| 51368 ||  || — || November 21, 2000 || Socorro || LINEAR || V || align=right | 2.2 km || 
|-id=369 bgcolor=#E9E9E9
| 51369 ||  || — || November 30, 2000 || Socorro || LINEAR || — || align=right | 5.4 km || 
|-id=370 bgcolor=#fefefe
| 51370 ||  || — || November 23, 2000 || Haleakala || NEAT || — || align=right | 3.1 km || 
|-id=371 bgcolor=#fefefe
| 51371 ||  || — || December 5, 2000 || Socorro || LINEAR || H || align=right | 3.0 km || 
|-id=372 bgcolor=#fefefe
| 51372 ||  || — || December 21, 2000 || Socorro || LINEAR || V || align=right | 2.0 km || 
|-id=373 bgcolor=#E9E9E9
| 51373 ||  || — || December 30, 2000 || Socorro || LINEAR || MAR || align=right | 3.3 km || 
|-id=374 bgcolor=#fefefe
| 51374 ||  || — || December 30, 2000 || Socorro || LINEAR || — || align=right | 2.2 km || 
|-id=375 bgcolor=#fefefe
| 51375 ||  || — || December 19, 2000 || Socorro || LINEAR || H || align=right | 1.8 km || 
|-id=376 bgcolor=#fefefe
| 51376 ||  || — || January 3, 2001 || Socorro || LINEAR || V || align=right | 2.0 km || 
|-id=377 bgcolor=#fefefe
| 51377 ||  || — || January 5, 2001 || Socorro || LINEAR || H || align=right | 2.0 km || 
|-id=378 bgcolor=#C2FFFF
| 51378 ||  || — || January 4, 2001 || Socorro || LINEAR || L4 || align=right | 23 km || 
|-id=379 bgcolor=#fefefe
| 51379 ||  || — || January 19, 2001 || Socorro || LINEAR || — || align=right | 2.7 km || 
|-id=380 bgcolor=#fefefe
| 51380 ||  || — || January 19, 2001 || Socorro || LINEAR || — || align=right | 4.8 km || 
|-id=381 bgcolor=#fefefe
| 51381 ||  || — || January 26, 2001 || Socorro || LINEAR || PHO || align=right | 3.8 km || 
|-id=382 bgcolor=#fefefe
| 51382 ||  || — || January 28, 2001 || Haleakala || NEAT || — || align=right | 2.9 km || 
|-id=383 bgcolor=#fefefe
| 51383 ||  || — || January 26, 2001 || Socorro || LINEAR || FLO || align=right | 1.8 km || 
|-id=384 bgcolor=#fefefe
| 51384 ||  || — || February 1, 2001 || Socorro || LINEAR || — || align=right | 2.6 km || 
|-id=385 bgcolor=#fefefe
| 51385 ||  || — || February 3, 2001 || Socorro || LINEAR || H || align=right | 1.2 km || 
|-id=386 bgcolor=#fefefe
| 51386 ||  || — || February 3, 2001 || Socorro || LINEAR || H || align=right | 2.0 km || 
|-id=387 bgcolor=#E9E9E9
| 51387 ||  || — || February 17, 2001 || Višnjan Observatory || K. Korlević || — || align=right | 4.7 km || 
|-id=388 bgcolor=#fefefe
| 51388 ||  || — || February 19, 2001 || Socorro || LINEAR || — || align=right | 1.5 km || 
|-id=389 bgcolor=#fefefe
| 51389 ||  || — || February 16, 2001 || Socorro || LINEAR || — || align=right | 1.9 km || 
|-id=390 bgcolor=#fefefe
| 51390 ||  || — || February 16, 2001 || Socorro || LINEAR || — || align=right | 5.1 km || 
|-id=391 bgcolor=#E9E9E9
| 51391 ||  || — || February 16, 2001 || Socorro || LINEAR || — || align=right | 3.6 km || 
|-id=392 bgcolor=#E9E9E9
| 51392 ||  || — || February 17, 2001 || Socorro || LINEAR || — || align=right | 4.7 km || 
|-id=393 bgcolor=#fefefe
| 51393 ||  || — || February 19, 2001 || Socorro || LINEAR || — || align=right | 2.4 km || 
|-id=394 bgcolor=#fefefe
| 51394 ||  || — || February 16, 2001 || Socorro || LINEAR || — || align=right | 2.7 km || 
|-id=395 bgcolor=#fefefe
| 51395 ||  || — || February 19, 2001 || Socorro || LINEAR || MAS || align=right | 1.8 km || 
|-id=396 bgcolor=#fefefe
| 51396 ||  || — || February 19, 2001 || Socorro || LINEAR || V || align=right | 1.6 km || 
|-id=397 bgcolor=#fefefe
| 51397 ||  || — || February 19, 2001 || Socorro || LINEAR || — || align=right | 4.3 km || 
|-id=398 bgcolor=#fefefe
| 51398 ||  || — || February 24, 2001 || Reedy Creek || J. Broughton || — || align=right | 2.6 km || 
|-id=399 bgcolor=#fefefe
| 51399 ||  || — || February 26, 2001 || Oizumi || T. Kobayashi || V || align=right | 1.9 km || 
|-id=400 bgcolor=#fefefe
| 51400 ||  || — || February 26, 2001 || Oizumi || T. Kobayashi || — || align=right | 4.9 km || 
|}

51401–51500 

|-bgcolor=#fefefe
| 51401 ||  || — || February 22, 2001 || Kitt Peak || Spacewatch || — || align=right | 1.2 km || 
|-id=402 bgcolor=#fefefe
| 51402 ||  || — || February 20, 2001 || Kitt Peak || Spacewatch || — || align=right | 2.0 km || 
|-id=403 bgcolor=#fefefe
| 51403 ||  || — || February 17, 2001 || Socorro || LINEAR || FLO || align=right | 1.6 km || 
|-id=404 bgcolor=#fefefe
| 51404 ||  || — || February 17, 2001 || Socorro || LINEAR || NYS || align=right | 1.8 km || 
|-id=405 bgcolor=#C2FFFF
| 51405 ||  || — || February 23, 2001 || Kitt Peak || Spacewatch || L4 || align=right | 14 km || 
|-id=406 bgcolor=#E9E9E9
| 51406 Massimocalvani ||  ||  || February 26, 2001 || Cima Ekar || ADAS || GER || align=right | 3.0 km || 
|-id=407 bgcolor=#fefefe
| 51407 ||  || — || March 2, 2001 || Anderson Mesa || LONEOS || — || align=right | 2.0 km || 
|-id=408 bgcolor=#fefefe
| 51408 ||  || — || March 2, 2001 || Anderson Mesa || LONEOS || NYS || align=right | 1.4 km || 
|-id=409 bgcolor=#E9E9E9
| 51409 ||  || — || March 2, 2001 || Anderson Mesa || LONEOS || — || align=right | 5.4 km || 
|-id=410 bgcolor=#fefefe
| 51410 ||  || — || March 2, 2001 || Anderson Mesa || LONEOS || — || align=right | 1.5 km || 
|-id=411 bgcolor=#fefefe
| 51411 ||  || — || March 2, 2001 || Anderson Mesa || LONEOS || — || align=right | 1.8 km || 
|-id=412 bgcolor=#fefefe
| 51412 ||  || — || March 2, 2001 || Anderson Mesa || LONEOS || NYS || align=right | 2.0 km || 
|-id=413 bgcolor=#E9E9E9
| 51413 ||  || — || March 2, 2001 || Haleakala || NEAT || ADE || align=right | 2.6 km || 
|-id=414 bgcolor=#E9E9E9
| 51414 ||  || — || March 3, 2001 || Socorro || LINEAR || — || align=right | 3.6 km || 
|-id=415 bgcolor=#fefefe
| 51415 Tovinder ||  ||  || March 15, 2001 || Needville || J. Dellinger, W. G. Dillon || V || align=right | 2.2 km || 
|-id=416 bgcolor=#E9E9E9
| 51416 ||  || — || March 15, 2001 || Oizumi || T. Kobayashi || — || align=right | 4.2 km || 
|-id=417 bgcolor=#fefefe
| 51417 ||  || — || March 15, 2001 || Socorro || LINEAR || H || align=right | 1.4 km || 
|-id=418 bgcolor=#fefefe
| 51418 ||  || — || March 15, 2001 || Socorro || LINEAR || H || align=right | 1.3 km || 
|-id=419 bgcolor=#fefefe
| 51419 Deshapriya ||  ||  || March 15, 2001 || Anderson Mesa || LONEOS || NYS || align=right | 2.9 km || 
|-id=420 bgcolor=#fefefe
| 51420 ||  || — || March 15, 2001 || Anderson Mesa || LONEOS || ERI || align=right | 3.7 km || 
|-id=421 bgcolor=#fefefe
| 51421 ||  || — || March 15, 2001 || Anderson Mesa || LONEOS || FLO || align=right | 1.6 km || 
|-id=422 bgcolor=#fefefe
| 51422 ||  || — || March 3, 2001 || Socorro || LINEAR || — || align=right | 2.0 km || 
|-id=423 bgcolor=#fefefe
| 51423 || 2001 FJ || — || March 16, 2001 || Haleakala || NEAT || MAS || align=right | 2.0 km || 
|-id=424 bgcolor=#fefefe
| 51424 || 2001 FK || — || March 16, 2001 || Socorro || LINEAR || H || align=right | 1.4 km || 
|-id=425 bgcolor=#fefefe
| 51425 ||  || — || March 16, 2001 || Socorro || LINEAR || — || align=right | 2.4 km || 
|-id=426 bgcolor=#fefefe
| 51426 ||  || — || March 18, 2001 || Socorro || LINEAR || NYS || align=right | 1.4 km || 
|-id=427 bgcolor=#E9E9E9
| 51427 ||  || — || March 19, 2001 || Oizumi || T. Kobayashi || — || align=right | 2.2 km || 
|-id=428 bgcolor=#fefefe
| 51428 ||  || — || March 18, 2001 || Socorro || LINEAR || — || align=right | 2.6 km || 
|-id=429 bgcolor=#E9E9E9
| 51429 ||  || — || March 18, 2001 || Socorro || LINEAR || ADE || align=right | 4.9 km || 
|-id=430 bgcolor=#fefefe
| 51430 Ireneclaire ||  ||  || March 20, 2001 || Nogales || Tenagra II Obs. || V || align=right | 1.5 km || 
|-id=431 bgcolor=#fefefe
| 51431 Jayardee ||  ||  || March 19, 2001 || Cordell-Lorenz || D. T. Durig || NYS || align=right | 3.7 km || 
|-id=432 bgcolor=#fefefe
| 51432 ||  || — || March 19, 2001 || Anderson Mesa || LONEOS || FLO || align=right | 2.1 km || 
|-id=433 bgcolor=#fefefe
| 51433 ||  || — || March 19, 2001 || Anderson Mesa || LONEOS || FLO || align=right | 2.0 km || 
|-id=434 bgcolor=#d6d6d6
| 51434 ||  || — || March 19, 2001 || Anderson Mesa || LONEOS || ALA || align=right | 11 km || 
|-id=435 bgcolor=#fefefe
| 51435 ||  || — || March 19, 2001 || Anderson Mesa || LONEOS || FLO || align=right | 2.0 km || 
|-id=436 bgcolor=#E9E9E9
| 51436 ||  || — || March 19, 2001 || Anderson Mesa || LONEOS || — || align=right | 4.2 km || 
|-id=437 bgcolor=#E9E9E9
| 51437 ||  || — || March 21, 2001 || Anderson Mesa || LONEOS || — || align=right | 3.0 km || 
|-id=438 bgcolor=#fefefe
| 51438 ||  || — || March 21, 2001 || Anderson Mesa || LONEOS || V || align=right | 2.1 km || 
|-id=439 bgcolor=#fefefe
| 51439 ||  || — || March 19, 2001 || Socorro || LINEAR || — || align=right | 1.5 km || 
|-id=440 bgcolor=#fefefe
| 51440 ||  || — || March 17, 2001 || Socorro || LINEAR || — || align=right | 2.3 km || 
|-id=441 bgcolor=#fefefe
| 51441 ||  || — || March 18, 2001 || Socorro || LINEAR || — || align=right | 2.2 km || 
|-id=442 bgcolor=#E9E9E9
| 51442 ||  || — || March 18, 2001 || Socorro || LINEAR || — || align=right | 4.5 km || 
|-id=443 bgcolor=#fefefe
| 51443 ||  || — || March 18, 2001 || Socorro || LINEAR || FLO || align=right | 1.9 km || 
|-id=444 bgcolor=#fefefe
| 51444 ||  || — || March 18, 2001 || Socorro || LINEAR || — || align=right | 2.0 km || 
|-id=445 bgcolor=#fefefe
| 51445 ||  || — || March 19, 2001 || Socorro || LINEAR || V || align=right | 1.5 km || 
|-id=446 bgcolor=#fefefe
| 51446 ||  || — || March 19, 2001 || Socorro || LINEAR || FLO || align=right | 1.6 km || 
|-id=447 bgcolor=#E9E9E9
| 51447 ||  || — || March 19, 2001 || Socorro || LINEAR || — || align=right | 2.2 km || 
|-id=448 bgcolor=#E9E9E9
| 51448 ||  || — || March 19, 2001 || Socorro || LINEAR || INO || align=right | 3.6 km || 
|-id=449 bgcolor=#fefefe
| 51449 ||  || — || March 19, 2001 || Socorro || LINEAR || V || align=right | 1.9 km || 
|-id=450 bgcolor=#fefefe
| 51450 ||  || — || March 21, 2001 || Haleakala || NEAT || — || align=right | 4.2 km || 
|-id=451 bgcolor=#fefefe
| 51451 ||  || — || March 22, 2001 || Reedy Creek || J. Broughton || NYS || align=right | 1.7 km || 
|-id=452 bgcolor=#fefefe
| 51452 ||  || — || March 18, 2001 || Socorro || LINEAR || — || align=right | 1.5 km || 
|-id=453 bgcolor=#E9E9E9
| 51453 ||  || — || March 18, 2001 || Socorro || LINEAR || — || align=right | 2.7 km || 
|-id=454 bgcolor=#fefefe
| 51454 ||  || — || March 18, 2001 || Socorro || LINEAR || FLO || align=right | 1.5 km || 
|-id=455 bgcolor=#fefefe
| 51455 ||  || — || March 18, 2001 || Socorro || LINEAR || ERI || align=right | 3.2 km || 
|-id=456 bgcolor=#fefefe
| 51456 ||  || — || March 18, 2001 || Socorro || LINEAR || — || align=right | 2.5 km || 
|-id=457 bgcolor=#fefefe
| 51457 ||  || — || March 18, 2001 || Socorro || LINEAR || — || align=right | 2.7 km || 
|-id=458 bgcolor=#fefefe
| 51458 ||  || — || March 18, 2001 || Socorro || LINEAR || — || align=right | 1.6 km || 
|-id=459 bgcolor=#fefefe
| 51459 ||  || — || March 18, 2001 || Socorro || LINEAR || — || align=right | 2.4 km || 
|-id=460 bgcolor=#fefefe
| 51460 ||  || — || March 18, 2001 || Socorro || LINEAR || — || align=right | 1.8 km || 
|-id=461 bgcolor=#fefefe
| 51461 ||  || — || March 18, 2001 || Socorro || LINEAR || NYS || align=right | 1.8 km || 
|-id=462 bgcolor=#fefefe
| 51462 ||  || — || March 18, 2001 || Socorro || LINEAR || — || align=right | 1.6 km || 
|-id=463 bgcolor=#fefefe
| 51463 ||  || — || March 18, 2001 || Socorro || LINEAR || NYS || align=right | 1.9 km || 
|-id=464 bgcolor=#E9E9E9
| 51464 ||  || — || March 18, 2001 || Socorro || LINEAR || — || align=right | 3.9 km || 
|-id=465 bgcolor=#fefefe
| 51465 ||  || — || March 18, 2001 || Socorro || LINEAR || FLO || align=right | 1.7 km || 
|-id=466 bgcolor=#E9E9E9
| 51466 ||  || — || March 18, 2001 || Socorro || LINEAR || — || align=right | 7.0 km || 
|-id=467 bgcolor=#fefefe
| 51467 ||  || — || March 18, 2001 || Socorro || LINEAR || FLO || align=right | 2.5 km || 
|-id=468 bgcolor=#fefefe
| 51468 ||  || — || March 18, 2001 || Socorro || LINEAR || — || align=right | 2.2 km || 
|-id=469 bgcolor=#fefefe
| 51469 ||  || — || March 18, 2001 || Socorro || LINEAR || — || align=right | 1.6 km || 
|-id=470 bgcolor=#fefefe
| 51470 ||  || — || March 18, 2001 || Socorro || LINEAR || — || align=right | 2.1 km || 
|-id=471 bgcolor=#fefefe
| 51471 ||  || — || March 18, 2001 || Socorro || LINEAR || — || align=right | 1.9 km || 
|-id=472 bgcolor=#E9E9E9
| 51472 ||  || — || March 18, 2001 || Socorro || LINEAR || CLO || align=right | 7.5 km || 
|-id=473 bgcolor=#E9E9E9
| 51473 ||  || — || March 19, 2001 || Socorro || LINEAR || — || align=right | 1.9 km || 
|-id=474 bgcolor=#fefefe
| 51474 ||  || — || March 21, 2001 || Socorro || LINEAR || — || align=right | 2.5 km || 
|-id=475 bgcolor=#E9E9E9
| 51475 ||  || — || March 21, 2001 || Socorro || LINEAR || — || align=right | 3.6 km || 
|-id=476 bgcolor=#fefefe
| 51476 ||  || — || March 21, 2001 || Socorro || LINEAR || — || align=right | 4.7 km || 
|-id=477 bgcolor=#fefefe
| 51477 ||  || — || March 19, 2001 || Socorro || LINEAR || — || align=right | 2.3 km || 
|-id=478 bgcolor=#fefefe
| 51478 ||  || — || March 19, 2001 || Socorro || LINEAR || V || align=right | 2.0 km || 
|-id=479 bgcolor=#fefefe
| 51479 ||  || — || March 19, 2001 || Socorro || LINEAR || — || align=right | 2.1 km || 
|-id=480 bgcolor=#fefefe
| 51480 ||  || — || March 19, 2001 || Socorro || LINEAR || — || align=right | 2.0 km || 
|-id=481 bgcolor=#fefefe
| 51481 ||  || — || March 19, 2001 || Socorro || LINEAR || FLO || align=right | 2.0 km || 
|-id=482 bgcolor=#fefefe
| 51482 ||  || — || March 19, 2001 || Socorro || LINEAR || — || align=right | 2.0 km || 
|-id=483 bgcolor=#E9E9E9
| 51483 ||  || — || March 19, 2001 || Socorro || LINEAR || CLO || align=right | 3.4 km || 
|-id=484 bgcolor=#fefefe
| 51484 ||  || — || March 19, 2001 || Socorro || LINEAR || FLO || align=right | 1.5 km || 
|-id=485 bgcolor=#fefefe
| 51485 ||  || — || March 19, 2001 || Socorro || LINEAR || V || align=right | 2.0 km || 
|-id=486 bgcolor=#fefefe
| 51486 ||  || — || March 19, 2001 || Socorro || LINEAR || — || align=right | 2.5 km || 
|-id=487 bgcolor=#fefefe
| 51487 ||  || — || March 19, 2001 || Socorro || LINEAR || V || align=right | 1.8 km || 
|-id=488 bgcolor=#E9E9E9
| 51488 ||  || — || March 19, 2001 || Socorro || LINEAR || MAR || align=right | 3.6 km || 
|-id=489 bgcolor=#fefefe
| 51489 ||  || — || March 19, 2001 || Socorro || LINEAR || V || align=right | 1.8 km || 
|-id=490 bgcolor=#fefefe
| 51490 ||  || — || March 19, 2001 || Socorro || LINEAR || — || align=right | 1.9 km || 
|-id=491 bgcolor=#fefefe
| 51491 ||  || — || March 19, 2001 || Socorro || LINEAR || FLO || align=right | 2.4 km || 
|-id=492 bgcolor=#fefefe
| 51492 ||  || — || March 19, 2001 || Socorro || LINEAR || V || align=right | 2.1 km || 
|-id=493 bgcolor=#fefefe
| 51493 ||  || — || March 19, 2001 || Socorro || LINEAR || — || align=right | 2.1 km || 
|-id=494 bgcolor=#d6d6d6
| 51494 ||  || — || March 19, 2001 || Socorro || LINEAR || — || align=right | 7.5 km || 
|-id=495 bgcolor=#fefefe
| 51495 ||  || — || March 21, 2001 || Socorro || LINEAR || — || align=right | 3.7 km || 
|-id=496 bgcolor=#d6d6d6
| 51496 ||  || — || March 21, 2001 || Socorro || LINEAR || AEG || align=right | 9.8 km || 
|-id=497 bgcolor=#E9E9E9
| 51497 ||  || — || March 21, 2001 || Socorro || LINEAR || — || align=right | 3.8 km || 
|-id=498 bgcolor=#fefefe
| 51498 ||  || — || March 21, 2001 || Socorro || LINEAR || — || align=right | 2.7 km || 
|-id=499 bgcolor=#fefefe
| 51499 ||  || — || March 23, 2001 || Socorro || LINEAR || — || align=right | 1.7 km || 
|-id=500 bgcolor=#fefefe
| 51500 ||  || — || March 24, 2001 || Socorro || LINEAR || — || align=right | 3.9 km || 
|}

51501–51600 

|-bgcolor=#fefefe
| 51501 ||  || — || March 27, 2001 || Desert Beaver || W. K. Y. Yeung || — || align=right | 1.8 km || 
|-id=502 bgcolor=#fefefe
| 51502 ||  || — || March 21, 2001 || Anderson Mesa || LONEOS || — || align=right | 2.3 km || 
|-id=503 bgcolor=#E9E9E9
| 51503 ||  || — || March 21, 2001 || Anderson Mesa || LONEOS || — || align=right | 3.5 km || 
|-id=504 bgcolor=#E9E9E9
| 51504 ||  || — || March 21, 2001 || Anderson Mesa || LONEOS || — || align=right | 2.9 km || 
|-id=505 bgcolor=#fefefe
| 51505 ||  || — || March 27, 2001 || Anderson Mesa || LONEOS || — || align=right | 1.8 km || 
|-id=506 bgcolor=#E9E9E9
| 51506 ||  || — || March 26, 2001 || Socorro || LINEAR || — || align=right | 3.7 km || 
|-id=507 bgcolor=#fefefe
| 51507 ||  || — || March 16, 2001 || Socorro || LINEAR || — || align=right | 2.2 km || 
|-id=508 bgcolor=#fefefe
| 51508 ||  || — || March 16, 2001 || Kitt Peak || Spacewatch || — || align=right | 1.4 km || 
|-id=509 bgcolor=#fefefe
| 51509 ||  || — || March 16, 2001 || Socorro || LINEAR || V || align=right | 2.1 km || 
|-id=510 bgcolor=#fefefe
| 51510 ||  || — || March 16, 2001 || Socorro || LINEAR || — || align=right | 3.3 km || 
|-id=511 bgcolor=#fefefe
| 51511 ||  || — || March 16, 2001 || Socorro || LINEAR || — || align=right | 2.5 km || 
|-id=512 bgcolor=#fefefe
| 51512 ||  || — || March 16, 2001 || Socorro || LINEAR || — || align=right | 2.9 km || 
|-id=513 bgcolor=#fefefe
| 51513 ||  || — || March 16, 2001 || Socorro || LINEAR || — || align=right | 3.2 km || 
|-id=514 bgcolor=#fefefe
| 51514 ||  || — || March 17, 2001 || Kitt Peak || Spacewatch || NYS || align=right | 1.8 km || 
|-id=515 bgcolor=#fefefe
| 51515 ||  || — || March 17, 2001 || Socorro || LINEAR || — || align=right | 2.9 km || 
|-id=516 bgcolor=#fefefe
| 51516 ||  || — || March 17, 2001 || Socorro || LINEAR || — || align=right | 4.9 km || 
|-id=517 bgcolor=#fefefe
| 51517 ||  || — || March 18, 2001 || Anderson Mesa || LONEOS || FLO || align=right | 2.1 km || 
|-id=518 bgcolor=#E9E9E9
| 51518 ||  || — || March 18, 2001 || Socorro || LINEAR || — || align=right | 3.3 km || 
|-id=519 bgcolor=#fefefe
| 51519 ||  || — || March 18, 2001 || Socorro || LINEAR || fast? || align=right | 2.1 km || 
|-id=520 bgcolor=#E9E9E9
| 51520 ||  || — || March 18, 2001 || Haleakala || NEAT || — || align=right | 5.0 km || 
|-id=521 bgcolor=#fefefe
| 51521 ||  || — || March 18, 2001 || Haleakala || NEAT || — || align=right | 2.8 km || 
|-id=522 bgcolor=#E9E9E9
| 51522 ||  || — || March 19, 2001 || Socorro || LINEAR || — || align=right | 2.7 km || 
|-id=523 bgcolor=#fefefe
| 51523 ||  || — || March 24, 2001 || Socorro || LINEAR || FLO || align=right | 1.7 km || 
|-id=524 bgcolor=#E9E9E9
| 51524 ||  || — || March 28, 2001 || Socorro || LINEAR || — || align=right | 2.4 km || 
|-id=525 bgcolor=#fefefe
| 51525 ||  || — || March 29, 2001 || Desert Beaver || W. K. Y. Yeung || — || align=right | 3.2 km || 
|-id=526 bgcolor=#fefefe
| 51526 ||  || — || March 23, 2001 || Anderson Mesa || LONEOS || — || align=right | 1.3 km || 
|-id=527 bgcolor=#E9E9E9
| 51527 ||  || — || March 23, 2001 || Anderson Mesa || LONEOS || — || align=right | 4.3 km || 
|-id=528 bgcolor=#fefefe
| 51528 ||  || — || March 23, 2001 || Anderson Mesa || LONEOS || — || align=right | 1.6 km || 
|-id=529 bgcolor=#d6d6d6
| 51529 ||  || — || March 31, 2001 || Desert Beaver || W. K. Y. Yeung || — || align=right | 6.3 km || 
|-id=530 bgcolor=#fefefe
| 51530 ||  || — || March 28, 2001 || Socorro || LINEAR || — || align=right | 2.1 km || 
|-id=531 bgcolor=#E9E9E9
| 51531 ||  || — || March 28, 2001 || Socorro || LINEAR || — || align=right | 2.8 km || 
|-id=532 bgcolor=#E9E9E9
| 51532 ||  || — || March 31, 2001 || Desert Beaver || W. K. Y. Yeung || — || align=right | 6.5 km || 
|-id=533 bgcolor=#fefefe
| 51533 ||  || — || March 20, 2001 || Kitt Peak || Spacewatch || — || align=right | 2.5 km || 
|-id=534 bgcolor=#fefefe
| 51534 ||  || — || March 20, 2001 || Haleakala || NEAT || ERI || align=right | 3.1 km || 
|-id=535 bgcolor=#fefefe
| 51535 ||  || — || March 20, 2001 || Haleakala || NEAT || V || align=right | 1.6 km || 
|-id=536 bgcolor=#fefefe
| 51536 ||  || — || March 20, 2001 || Haleakala || NEAT || — || align=right | 2.0 km || 
|-id=537 bgcolor=#d6d6d6
| 51537 ||  || — || March 20, 2001 || Haleakala || NEAT || — || align=right | 4.5 km || 
|-id=538 bgcolor=#E9E9E9
| 51538 ||  || — || March 23, 2001 || Haleakala || NEAT || PAE || align=right | 5.4 km || 
|-id=539 bgcolor=#E9E9E9
| 51539 ||  || — || March 23, 2001 || Anderson Mesa || LONEOS || — || align=right | 4.0 km || 
|-id=540 bgcolor=#E9E9E9
| 51540 ||  || — || March 23, 2001 || Anderson Mesa || LONEOS || — || align=right | 2.0 km || 
|-id=541 bgcolor=#fefefe
| 51541 ||  || — || March 23, 2001 || Haleakala || NEAT || H || align=right | 1.7 km || 
|-id=542 bgcolor=#E9E9E9
| 51542 ||  || — || March 24, 2001 || Anderson Mesa || LONEOS || — || align=right | 2.6 km || 
|-id=543 bgcolor=#fefefe
| 51543 ||  || — || March 24, 2001 || Anderson Mesa || LONEOS || FLO || align=right | 3.0 km || 
|-id=544 bgcolor=#fefefe
| 51544 ||  || — || March 24, 2001 || Socorro || LINEAR || V || align=right | 1.6 km || 
|-id=545 bgcolor=#fefefe
| 51545 ||  || — || March 27, 2001 || Haleakala || NEAT || MAS || align=right | 2.4 km || 
|-id=546 bgcolor=#fefefe
| 51546 ||  || — || March 29, 2001 || Anderson Mesa || LONEOS || V || align=right | 1.4 km || 
|-id=547 bgcolor=#fefefe
| 51547 ||  || — || March 29, 2001 || Anderson Mesa || LONEOS || — || align=right | 1.3 km || 
|-id=548 bgcolor=#fefefe
| 51548 ||  || — || March 29, 2001 || Anderson Mesa || LONEOS || — || align=right | 1.6 km || 
|-id=549 bgcolor=#fefefe
| 51549 ||  || — || March 29, 2001 || Haleakala || NEAT || — || align=right | 2.2 km || 
|-id=550 bgcolor=#E9E9E9
| 51550 ||  || — || March 30, 2001 || Socorro || LINEAR || — || align=right | 5.4 km || 
|-id=551 bgcolor=#E9E9E9
| 51551 ||  || — || March 18, 2001 || Socorro || LINEAR || — || align=right | 2.3 km || 
|-id=552 bgcolor=#fefefe
| 51552 ||  || — || March 18, 2001 || Socorro || LINEAR || — || align=right | 2.4 km || 
|-id=553 bgcolor=#fefefe
| 51553 ||  || — || March 18, 2001 || Socorro || LINEAR || — || align=right | 2.1 km || 
|-id=554 bgcolor=#fefefe
| 51554 ||  || — || March 18, 2001 || Socorro || LINEAR || PHO || align=right | 3.0 km || 
|-id=555 bgcolor=#fefefe
| 51555 ||  || — || March 19, 2001 || Anderson Mesa || LONEOS || — || align=right | 2.0 km || 
|-id=556 bgcolor=#E9E9E9
| 51556 ||  || — || March 24, 2001 || Socorro || LINEAR || — || align=right | 8.5 km || 
|-id=557 bgcolor=#d6d6d6
| 51557 ||  || — || March 16, 2001 || Socorro || LINEAR || YAK || align=right | 8.3 km || 
|-id=558 bgcolor=#E9E9E9
| 51558 ||  || — || April 15, 2001 || Socorro || LINEAR || — || align=right | 3.2 km || 
|-id=559 bgcolor=#fefefe
| 51559 ||  || — || April 15, 2001 || Socorro || LINEAR || V || align=right | 1.5 km || 
|-id=560 bgcolor=#fefefe
| 51560 ||  || — || April 15, 2001 || Socorro || LINEAR || FLO || align=right | 1.4 km || 
|-id=561 bgcolor=#fefefe
| 51561 ||  || — || April 15, 2001 || Socorro || LINEAR || — || align=right | 2.7 km || 
|-id=562 bgcolor=#fefefe
| 51562 ||  || — || April 15, 2001 || Socorro || LINEAR || V || align=right | 1.9 km || 
|-id=563 bgcolor=#fefefe
| 51563 || 2001 HK || — || April 16, 2001 || Socorro || LINEAR || NYS || align=right | 2.0 km || 
|-id=564 bgcolor=#fefefe
| 51564 || 2001 HZ || — || April 16, 2001 || Socorro || LINEAR || MAS || align=right | 2.0 km || 
|-id=565 bgcolor=#fefefe
| 51565 ||  || — || April 17, 2001 || Socorro || LINEAR || — || align=right | 2.9 km || 
|-id=566 bgcolor=#fefefe
| 51566 ||  || — || April 17, 2001 || Socorro || LINEAR || — || align=right | 2.2 km || 
|-id=567 bgcolor=#E9E9E9
| 51567 ||  || — || April 17, 2001 || Socorro || LINEAR || — || align=right | 4.1 km || 
|-id=568 bgcolor=#E9E9E9
| 51568 ||  || — || April 17, 2001 || Socorro || LINEAR || — || align=right | 2.7 km || 
|-id=569 bgcolor=#E9E9E9
| 51569 Garywessen ||  ||  || April 18, 2001 || Farpoint || G. Hug || EUN || align=right | 4.5 km || 
|-id=570 bgcolor=#E9E9E9
| 51570 Phendricksen ||  ||  || April 17, 2001 || Badlands || R. Dyvig || — || align=right | 3.2 km || 
|-id=571 bgcolor=#E9E9E9
| 51571 ||  || — || April 19, 2001 || Reedy Creek || J. Broughton || — || align=right | 2.0 km || 
|-id=572 bgcolor=#fefefe
| 51572 ||  || — || April 16, 2001 || Socorro || LINEAR || V || align=right | 1.9 km || 
|-id=573 bgcolor=#fefefe
| 51573 ||  || — || April 16, 2001 || Socorro || LINEAR || — || align=right | 2.3 km || 
|-id=574 bgcolor=#fefefe
| 51574 ||  || — || April 16, 2001 || Socorro || LINEAR || — || align=right | 2.5 km || 
|-id=575 bgcolor=#E9E9E9
| 51575 ||  || — || April 18, 2001 || Socorro || LINEAR || — || align=right | 2.7 km || 
|-id=576 bgcolor=#E9E9E9
| 51576 ||  || — || April 18, 2001 || Socorro || LINEAR || JUN || align=right | 4.2 km || 
|-id=577 bgcolor=#E9E9E9
| 51577 ||  || — || April 18, 2001 || Socorro || LINEAR || — || align=right | 2.5 km || 
|-id=578 bgcolor=#E9E9E9
| 51578 ||  || — || April 18, 2001 || Kitt Peak || Spacewatch || — || align=right | 2.2 km || 
|-id=579 bgcolor=#d6d6d6
| 51579 ||  || — || April 16, 2001 || Socorro || LINEAR || THM || align=right | 6.0 km || 
|-id=580 bgcolor=#E9E9E9
| 51580 ||  || — || April 16, 2001 || Socorro || LINEAR || — || align=right | 2.3 km || 
|-id=581 bgcolor=#fefefe
| 51581 ||  || — || April 16, 2001 || Socorro || LINEAR || — || align=right | 2.6 km || 
|-id=582 bgcolor=#fefefe
| 51582 ||  || — || April 16, 2001 || Socorro || LINEAR || — || align=right | 2.5 km || 
|-id=583 bgcolor=#E9E9E9
| 51583 ||  || — || April 16, 2001 || Socorro || LINEAR || — || align=right | 4.6 km || 
|-id=584 bgcolor=#fefefe
| 51584 ||  || — || April 16, 2001 || Socorro || LINEAR || V || align=right | 2.1 km || 
|-id=585 bgcolor=#fefefe
| 51585 ||  || — || April 18, 2001 || Socorro || LINEAR || — || align=right | 2.0 km || 
|-id=586 bgcolor=#fefefe
| 51586 ||  || — || April 18, 2001 || Socorro || LINEAR || NYS || align=right | 1.7 km || 
|-id=587 bgcolor=#E9E9E9
| 51587 ||  || — || April 18, 2001 || Socorro || LINEAR || — || align=right | 2.9 km || 
|-id=588 bgcolor=#E9E9E9
| 51588 ||  || — || April 18, 2001 || Socorro || LINEAR || — || align=right | 2.7 km || 
|-id=589 bgcolor=#E9E9E9
| 51589 ||  || — || April 21, 2001 || Socorro || LINEAR || EUN || align=right | 4.5 km || 
|-id=590 bgcolor=#fefefe
| 51590 ||  || — || April 23, 2001 || Reedy Creek || J. Broughton || NYS || align=right | 1.5 km || 
|-id=591 bgcolor=#fefefe
| 51591 ||  || — || April 17, 2001 || Socorro || LINEAR || — || align=right | 2.5 km || 
|-id=592 bgcolor=#fefefe
| 51592 ||  || — || April 23, 2001 || Socorro || LINEAR || — || align=right | 2.0 km || 
|-id=593 bgcolor=#E9E9E9
| 51593 ||  || — || April 21, 2001 || Socorro || LINEAR || — || align=right | 3.5 km || 
|-id=594 bgcolor=#E9E9E9
| 51594 ||  || — || April 21, 2001 || Socorro || LINEAR || — || align=right | 2.3 km || 
|-id=595 bgcolor=#fefefe
| 51595 ||  || — || April 23, 2001 || Socorro || LINEAR || — || align=right | 2.3 km || 
|-id=596 bgcolor=#E9E9E9
| 51596 ||  || — || April 23, 2001 || Socorro || LINEAR || MIS || align=right | 3.6 km || 
|-id=597 bgcolor=#fefefe
| 51597 ||  || — || April 16, 2001 || Haleakala || NEAT || — || align=right | 2.3 km || 
|-id=598 bgcolor=#fefefe
| 51598 ||  || — || April 27, 2001 || Kitt Peak || Spacewatch || — || align=right | 4.0 km || 
|-id=599 bgcolor=#fefefe
| 51599 Brittany ||  ||  || April 28, 2001 || Emerald Lane || L. Ball || — || align=right | 2.1 km || 
|-id=600 bgcolor=#E9E9E9
| 51600 ||  || — || April 27, 2001 || Socorro || LINEAR || MIS || align=right | 5.0 km || 
|}

51601–51700 

|-bgcolor=#fefefe
| 51601 ||  || — || April 27, 2001 || Socorro || LINEAR || — || align=right | 2.4 km || 
|-id=602 bgcolor=#d6d6d6
| 51602 ||  || — || April 27, 2001 || Socorro || LINEAR || — || align=right | 6.9 km || 
|-id=603 bgcolor=#fefefe
| 51603 ||  || — || April 27, 2001 || Socorro || LINEAR || FLO || align=right | 2.7 km || 
|-id=604 bgcolor=#E9E9E9
| 51604 ||  || — || April 27, 2001 || Socorro || LINEAR || — || align=right | 10 km || 
|-id=605 bgcolor=#E9E9E9
| 51605 ||  || — || April 27, 2001 || Socorro || LINEAR || MIS || align=right | 6.4 km || 
|-id=606 bgcolor=#fefefe
| 51606 ||  || — || April 27, 2001 || Socorro || LINEAR || — || align=right | 2.0 km || 
|-id=607 bgcolor=#E9E9E9
| 51607 ||  || — || April 27, 2001 || Socorro || LINEAR || — || align=right | 4.7 km || 
|-id=608 bgcolor=#fefefe
| 51608 ||  || — || April 24, 2001 || Socorro || LINEAR || FLO || align=right | 2.5 km || 
|-id=609 bgcolor=#fefefe
| 51609 ||  || — || April 27, 2001 || Socorro || LINEAR || V || align=right | 2.0 km || 
|-id=610 bgcolor=#fefefe
| 51610 ||  || — || April 27, 2001 || Socorro || LINEAR || NYS || align=right | 1.7 km || 
|-id=611 bgcolor=#E9E9E9
| 51611 ||  || — || April 27, 2001 || Socorro || LINEAR || — || align=right | 2.2 km || 
|-id=612 bgcolor=#d6d6d6
| 51612 ||  || — || April 27, 2001 || Socorro || LINEAR || HYG || align=right | 7.7 km || 
|-id=613 bgcolor=#E9E9E9
| 51613 ||  || — || April 27, 2001 || Socorro || LINEAR || — || align=right | 2.3 km || 
|-id=614 bgcolor=#E9E9E9
| 51614 ||  || — || April 27, 2001 || Socorro || LINEAR || — || align=right | 2.6 km || 
|-id=615 bgcolor=#fefefe
| 51615 ||  || — || April 27, 2001 || Socorro || LINEAR || V || align=right | 1.7 km || 
|-id=616 bgcolor=#E9E9E9
| 51616 ||  || — || April 29, 2001 || Socorro || LINEAR || EUN || align=right | 3.5 km || 
|-id=617 bgcolor=#E9E9E9
| 51617 ||  || — || April 29, 2001 || Socorro || LINEAR || — || align=right | 2.3 km || 
|-id=618 bgcolor=#E9E9E9
| 51618 ||  || — || April 29, 2001 || Socorro || LINEAR || — || align=right | 2.9 km || 
|-id=619 bgcolor=#fefefe
| 51619 ||  || — || April 29, 2001 || Socorro || LINEAR || — || align=right | 2.2 km || 
|-id=620 bgcolor=#fefefe
| 51620 ||  || — || April 29, 2001 || Socorro || LINEAR || — || align=right | 2.2 km || 
|-id=621 bgcolor=#fefefe
| 51621 ||  || — || April 29, 2001 || Socorro || LINEAR || — || align=right | 2.6 km || 
|-id=622 bgcolor=#E9E9E9
| 51622 ||  || — || April 29, 2001 || Socorro || LINEAR || — || align=right | 5.6 km || 
|-id=623 bgcolor=#fefefe
| 51623 ||  || — || April 29, 2001 || Socorro || LINEAR || FLO || align=right | 2.5 km || 
|-id=624 bgcolor=#E9E9E9
| 51624 ||  || — || April 29, 2001 || Socorro || LINEAR || — || align=right | 4.1 km || 
|-id=625 bgcolor=#fefefe
| 51625 ||  || — || April 29, 2001 || Črni Vrh || Črni Vrh || V || align=right | 1.8 km || 
|-id=626 bgcolor=#fefefe
| 51626 ||  || — || April 30, 2001 || Desert Beaver || W. K. Y. Yeung || — || align=right | 2.5 km || 
|-id=627 bgcolor=#E9E9E9
| 51627 ||  || — || April 30, 2001 || Desert Beaver || W. K. Y. Yeung || GEF || align=right | 9.6 km || 
|-id=628 bgcolor=#fefefe
| 51628 ||  || — || April 16, 2001 || Socorro || LINEAR || V || align=right | 2.0 km || 
|-id=629 bgcolor=#fefefe
| 51629 ||  || — || April 16, 2001 || Anderson Mesa || LONEOS || V || align=right | 1.6 km || 
|-id=630 bgcolor=#fefefe
| 51630 ||  || — || April 16, 2001 || Socorro || LINEAR || — || align=right | 2.2 km || 
|-id=631 bgcolor=#fefefe
| 51631 ||  || — || April 18, 2001 || Socorro || LINEAR || NYS || align=right | 1.6 km || 
|-id=632 bgcolor=#d6d6d6
| 51632 ||  || — || April 18, 2001 || Socorro || LINEAR || — || align=right | 7.2 km || 
|-id=633 bgcolor=#fefefe
| 51633 ||  || — || April 18, 2001 || Socorro || LINEAR || V || align=right | 1.6 km || 
|-id=634 bgcolor=#fefefe
| 51634 ||  || — || April 19, 2001 || Haleakala || NEAT || H || align=right | 1.6 km || 
|-id=635 bgcolor=#fefefe
| 51635 ||  || — || April 21, 2001 || Socorro || LINEAR || — || align=right | 2.2 km || 
|-id=636 bgcolor=#fefefe
| 51636 ||  || — || April 21, 2001 || Socorro || LINEAR || — || align=right | 2.3 km || 
|-id=637 bgcolor=#fefefe
| 51637 ||  || — || April 21, 2001 || Socorro || LINEAR || — || align=right | 2.8 km || 
|-id=638 bgcolor=#fefefe
| 51638 ||  || — || April 23, 2001 || Socorro || LINEAR || — || align=right | 2.2 km || 
|-id=639 bgcolor=#E9E9E9
| 51639 ||  || — || April 23, 2001 || Socorro || LINEAR || MRX || align=right | 3.1 km || 
|-id=640 bgcolor=#fefefe
| 51640 ||  || — || April 24, 2001 || Socorro || LINEAR || V || align=right | 1.4 km || 
|-id=641 bgcolor=#fefefe
| 51641 ||  || — || April 24, 2001 || Socorro || LINEAR || — || align=right | 2.2 km || 
|-id=642 bgcolor=#d6d6d6
| 51642 ||  || — || April 24, 2001 || Socorro || LINEAR || — || align=right | 11 km || 
|-id=643 bgcolor=#E9E9E9
| 51643 ||  || — || April 24, 2001 || Haleakala || NEAT || — || align=right | 2.1 km || 
|-id=644 bgcolor=#fefefe
| 51644 ||  || — || April 23, 2001 || Socorro || LINEAR || V || align=right | 1.8 km || 
|-id=645 bgcolor=#E9E9E9
| 51645 ||  || — || April 24, 2001 || Anderson Mesa || LONEOS || — || align=right | 2.9 km || 
|-id=646 bgcolor=#fefefe
| 51646 ||  || — || April 26, 2001 || Anderson Mesa || LONEOS || — || align=right | 2.0 km || 
|-id=647 bgcolor=#fefefe
| 51647 ||  || — || April 26, 2001 || Anderson Mesa || LONEOS || — || align=right | 2.1 km || 
|-id=648 bgcolor=#fefefe
| 51648 ||  || — || April 26, 2001 || Anderson Mesa || LONEOS || — || align=right | 2.7 km || 
|-id=649 bgcolor=#fefefe
| 51649 ||  || — || April 27, 2001 || Socorro || LINEAR || MAS || align=right | 1.6 km || 
|-id=650 bgcolor=#fefefe
| 51650 ||  || — || April 27, 2001 || Socorro || LINEAR || — || align=right | 2.4 km || 
|-id=651 bgcolor=#fefefe
| 51651 ||  || — || April 28, 2001 || Kitt Peak || Spacewatch || — || align=right | 2.9 km || 
|-id=652 bgcolor=#E9E9E9
| 51652 ||  || — || April 29, 2001 || Socorro || LINEAR || — || align=right | 2.6 km || 
|-id=653 bgcolor=#fefefe
| 51653 ||  || — || April 30, 2001 || Socorro || LINEAR || V || align=right | 1.8 km || 
|-id=654 bgcolor=#E9E9E9
| 51654 ||  || — || April 24, 2001 || Socorro || LINEAR || MAR || align=right | 2.1 km || 
|-id=655 bgcolor=#E9E9E9
| 51655 Susannemond || 2001 JA ||  || May 1, 2001 || Kanab || E. E. Sheridan || — || align=right | 3.4 km || 
|-id=656 bgcolor=#E9E9E9
| 51656 || 2001 JD || — || May 1, 2001 || Desert Beaver || W. K. Y. Yeung || EUN || align=right | 4.4 km || 
|-id=657 bgcolor=#fefefe
| 51657 || 2001 JG || — || May 2, 2001 || Palomar || NEAT || — || align=right | 3.2 km || 
|-id=658 bgcolor=#d6d6d6
| 51658 ||  || — || May 2, 2001 || Kitt Peak || Spacewatch || — || align=right | 4.5 km || 
|-id=659 bgcolor=#fefefe
| 51659 Robohachi ||  ||  || May 14, 2001 || Bisei SG Center || BATTeRS || — || align=right | 2.5 km || 
|-id=660 bgcolor=#fefefe
| 51660 ||  || — || May 12, 2001 || Haleakala || NEAT || V || align=right | 2.3 km || 
|-id=661 bgcolor=#fefefe
| 51661 ||  || — || May 14, 2001 || Palomar || NEAT || — || align=right | 2.8 km || 
|-id=662 bgcolor=#E9E9E9
| 51662 ||  || — || May 15, 2001 || Anderson Mesa || LONEOS || — || align=right | 2.8 km || 
|-id=663 bgcolor=#fefefe
| 51663 Lovelock ||  ||  || May 15, 2001 || Anderson Mesa || LONEOS || FLO || align=right | 1.2 km || 
|-id=664 bgcolor=#d6d6d6
| 51664 ||  || — || May 15, 2001 || Haleakala || NEAT || — || align=right | 6.8 km || 
|-id=665 bgcolor=#E9E9E9
| 51665 ||  || — || May 15, 2001 || Anderson Mesa || LONEOS || GEF || align=right | 3.6 km || 
|-id=666 bgcolor=#E9E9E9
| 51666 ||  || — || May 17, 2001 || Socorro || LINEAR || EUN || align=right | 2.6 km || 
|-id=667 bgcolor=#E9E9E9
| 51667 ||  || — || May 17, 2001 || Socorro || LINEAR || — || align=right | 2.2 km || 
|-id=668 bgcolor=#E9E9E9
| 51668 ||  || — || May 17, 2001 || Socorro || LINEAR || AGN || align=right | 4.1 km || 
|-id=669 bgcolor=#d6d6d6
| 51669 ||  || — || May 17, 2001 || Socorro || LINEAR || — || align=right | 8.1 km || 
|-id=670 bgcolor=#E9E9E9
| 51670 ||  || — || May 17, 2001 || Socorro || LINEAR || — || align=right | 2.3 km || 
|-id=671 bgcolor=#fefefe
| 51671 ||  || — || May 17, 2001 || Socorro || LINEAR || NYS || align=right | 1.7 km || 
|-id=672 bgcolor=#E9E9E9
| 51672 ||  || — || May 17, 2001 || Socorro || LINEAR || — || align=right | 6.8 km || 
|-id=673 bgcolor=#E9E9E9
| 51673 ||  || — || May 17, 2001 || Socorro || LINEAR || — || align=right | 5.2 km || 
|-id=674 bgcolor=#fefefe
| 51674 ||  || — || May 17, 2001 || Socorro || LINEAR || — || align=right | 2.7 km || 
|-id=675 bgcolor=#E9E9E9
| 51675 ||  || — || May 18, 2001 || Socorro || LINEAR || — || align=right | 2.1 km || 
|-id=676 bgcolor=#fefefe
| 51676 ||  || — || May 18, 2001 || Socorro || LINEAR || V || align=right | 1.7 km || 
|-id=677 bgcolor=#E9E9E9
| 51677 ||  || — || May 18, 2001 || Socorro || LINEAR || — || align=right | 2.9 km || 
|-id=678 bgcolor=#fefefe
| 51678 ||  || — || May 18, 2001 || Socorro || LINEAR || — || align=right | 2.5 km || 
|-id=679 bgcolor=#fefefe
| 51679 ||  || — || May 18, 2001 || Socorro || LINEAR || V || align=right | 3.0 km || 
|-id=680 bgcolor=#E9E9E9
| 51680 ||  || — || May 18, 2001 || Socorro || LINEAR || — || align=right | 3.5 km || 
|-id=681 bgcolor=#E9E9E9
| 51681 ||  || — || May 18, 2001 || Socorro || LINEAR || — || align=right | 2.5 km || 
|-id=682 bgcolor=#E9E9E9
| 51682 ||  || — || May 18, 2001 || Socorro || LINEAR || — || align=right | 5.6 km || 
|-id=683 bgcolor=#E9E9E9
| 51683 ||  || — || May 18, 2001 || Socorro || LINEAR || — || align=right | 6.3 km || 
|-id=684 bgcolor=#E9E9E9
| 51684 ||  || — || May 18, 2001 || Socorro || LINEAR || ADE || align=right | 8.1 km || 
|-id=685 bgcolor=#E9E9E9
| 51685 ||  || — || May 18, 2001 || Socorro || LINEAR || — || align=right | 4.5 km || 
|-id=686 bgcolor=#d6d6d6
| 51686 ||  || — || May 18, 2001 || Socorro || LINEAR || TIR || align=right | 8.2 km || 
|-id=687 bgcolor=#fefefe
| 51687 ||  || — || May 18, 2001 || Socorro || LINEAR || V || align=right | 2.6 km || 
|-id=688 bgcolor=#fefefe
| 51688 ||  || — || May 18, 2001 || Socorro || LINEAR || — || align=right | 2.4 km || 
|-id=689 bgcolor=#E9E9E9
| 51689 ||  || — || May 18, 2001 || Socorro || LINEAR || EUN || align=right | 4.4 km || 
|-id=690 bgcolor=#fefefe
| 51690 ||  || — || May 20, 2001 || Socorro || LINEAR || ERI || align=right | 4.4 km || 
|-id=691 bgcolor=#E9E9E9
| 51691 ||  || — || May 17, 2001 || Socorro || LINEAR || MIS || align=right | 6.0 km || 
|-id=692 bgcolor=#E9E9E9
| 51692 ||  || — || May 17, 2001 || Socorro || LINEAR || — || align=right | 2.2 km || 
|-id=693 bgcolor=#fefefe
| 51693 ||  || — || May 18, 2001 || Socorro || LINEAR || FLO || align=right | 1.9 km || 
|-id=694 bgcolor=#d6d6d6
| 51694 ||  || — || May 18, 2001 || Socorro || LINEAR || — || align=right | 7.0 km || 
|-id=695 bgcolor=#E9E9E9
| 51695 ||  || — || May 18, 2001 || Socorro || LINEAR || RAF || align=right | 3.5 km || 
|-id=696 bgcolor=#fefefe
| 51696 ||  || — || May 18, 2001 || Socorro || LINEAR || V || align=right | 1.5 km || 
|-id=697 bgcolor=#E9E9E9
| 51697 ||  || — || May 18, 2001 || Socorro || LINEAR || — || align=right | 3.6 km || 
|-id=698 bgcolor=#fefefe
| 51698 ||  || — || May 17, 2001 || Kitt Peak || Spacewatch || V || align=right | 2.0 km || 
|-id=699 bgcolor=#E9E9E9
| 51699 ||  || — || May 21, 2001 || Anderson Mesa || LONEOS || — || align=right | 3.2 km || 
|-id=700 bgcolor=#E9E9E9
| 51700 ||  || — || May 17, 2001 || Socorro || LINEAR || — || align=right | 4.3 km || 
|}

51701–51800 

|-bgcolor=#fefefe
| 51701 ||  || — || May 17, 2001 || Socorro || LINEAR || — || align=right | 2.3 km || 
|-id=702 bgcolor=#fefefe
| 51702 ||  || — || May 17, 2001 || Socorro || LINEAR || V || align=right | 2.0 km || 
|-id=703 bgcolor=#E9E9E9
| 51703 ||  || — || May 17, 2001 || Socorro || LINEAR || — || align=right | 2.3 km || 
|-id=704 bgcolor=#E9E9E9
| 51704 ||  || — || May 17, 2001 || Socorro || LINEAR || HEN || align=right | 3.0 km || 
|-id=705 bgcolor=#d6d6d6
| 51705 ||  || — || May 17, 2001 || Socorro || LINEAR || — || align=right | 5.0 km || 
|-id=706 bgcolor=#fefefe
| 51706 ||  || — || May 17, 2001 || Socorro || LINEAR || — || align=right | 2.2 km || 
|-id=707 bgcolor=#d6d6d6
| 51707 ||  || — || May 21, 2001 || Socorro || LINEAR || — || align=right | 5.8 km || 
|-id=708 bgcolor=#fefefe
| 51708 ||  || — || May 21, 2001 || Socorro || LINEAR || — || align=right | 2.2 km || 
|-id=709 bgcolor=#fefefe
| 51709 ||  || — || May 21, 2001 || Socorro || LINEAR || NYS || align=right | 2.0 km || 
|-id=710 bgcolor=#fefefe
| 51710 ||  || — || May 21, 2001 || Socorro || LINEAR || — || align=right | 2.1 km || 
|-id=711 bgcolor=#fefefe
| 51711 ||  || — || May 21, 2001 || Socorro || LINEAR || V || align=right | 1.9 km || 
|-id=712 bgcolor=#E9E9E9
| 51712 ||  || — || May 21, 2001 || Socorro || LINEAR || — || align=right | 3.5 km || 
|-id=713 bgcolor=#E9E9E9
| 51713 ||  || — || May 21, 2001 || Socorro || LINEAR || — || align=right | 2.0 km || 
|-id=714 bgcolor=#d6d6d6
| 51714 ||  || — || May 21, 2001 || Socorro || LINEAR || — || align=right | 7.3 km || 
|-id=715 bgcolor=#fefefe
| 51715 ||  || — || May 21, 2001 || Socorro || LINEAR || V || align=right | 1.8 km || 
|-id=716 bgcolor=#fefefe
| 51716 ||  || — || May 22, 2001 || Socorro || LINEAR || — || align=right | 4.1 km || 
|-id=717 bgcolor=#E9E9E9
| 51717 ||  || — || May 22, 2001 || Socorro || LINEAR || EUN || align=right | 2.8 km || 
|-id=718 bgcolor=#E9E9E9
| 51718 ||  || — || May 18, 2001 || Socorro || LINEAR || — || align=right | 4.8 km || 
|-id=719 bgcolor=#E9E9E9
| 51719 ||  || — || May 18, 2001 || Socorro || LINEAR || — || align=right | 2.7 km || 
|-id=720 bgcolor=#d6d6d6
| 51720 ||  || — || May 21, 2001 || Socorro || LINEAR || — || align=right | 6.3 km || 
|-id=721 bgcolor=#d6d6d6
| 51721 ||  || — || May 22, 2001 || Socorro || LINEAR || CHA || align=right | 5.0 km || 
|-id=722 bgcolor=#E9E9E9
| 51722 ||  || — || May 22, 2001 || Socorro || LINEAR || — || align=right | 3.8 km || 
|-id=723 bgcolor=#E9E9E9
| 51723 ||  || — || May 22, 2001 || Socorro || LINEAR || EUN || align=right | 2.6 km || 
|-id=724 bgcolor=#E9E9E9
| 51724 ||  || — || May 22, 2001 || Socorro || LINEAR || — || align=right | 3.0 km || 
|-id=725 bgcolor=#d6d6d6
| 51725 ||  || — || May 22, 2001 || Socorro || LINEAR || — || align=right | 6.8 km || 
|-id=726 bgcolor=#E9E9E9
| 51726 ||  || — || May 23, 2001 || Socorro || LINEAR || — || align=right | 4.4 km || 
|-id=727 bgcolor=#E9E9E9
| 51727 ||  || — || May 24, 2001 || Palomar || NEAT || GEF || align=right | 3.8 km || 
|-id=728 bgcolor=#fefefe
| 51728 ||  || — || May 22, 2001 || Socorro || LINEAR || — || align=right | 2.2 km || 
|-id=729 bgcolor=#d6d6d6
| 51729 ||  || — || May 22, 2001 || Socorro || LINEAR || — || align=right | 8.6 km || 
|-id=730 bgcolor=#E9E9E9
| 51730 ||  || — || May 22, 2001 || Socorro || LINEAR || ADE || align=right | 5.4 km || 
|-id=731 bgcolor=#fefefe
| 51731 ||  || — || May 22, 2001 || Socorro || LINEAR || FLO || align=right | 1.7 km || 
|-id=732 bgcolor=#E9E9E9
| 51732 ||  || — || May 22, 2001 || Socorro || LINEAR || ADE || align=right | 7.7 km || 
|-id=733 bgcolor=#fefefe
| 51733 ||  || — || May 22, 2001 || Socorro || LINEAR || — || align=right | 5.0 km || 
|-id=734 bgcolor=#E9E9E9
| 51734 ||  || — || May 22, 2001 || Socorro || LINEAR || EUN || align=right | 3.6 km || 
|-id=735 bgcolor=#E9E9E9
| 51735 ||  || — || May 24, 2001 || Socorro || LINEAR || — || align=right | 2.7 km || 
|-id=736 bgcolor=#fefefe
| 51736 ||  || — || May 24, 2001 || Socorro || LINEAR || — || align=right | 3.0 km || 
|-id=737 bgcolor=#fefefe
| 51737 ||  || — || May 24, 2001 || Socorro || LINEAR || — || align=right | 2.3 km || 
|-id=738 bgcolor=#fefefe
| 51738 ||  || — || May 24, 2001 || Socorro || LINEAR || — || align=right | 2.2 km || 
|-id=739 bgcolor=#fefefe
| 51739 ||  || — || May 24, 2001 || Socorro || LINEAR || NYS || align=right | 2.1 km || 
|-id=740 bgcolor=#E9E9E9
| 51740 ||  || — || May 24, 2001 || Socorro || LINEAR || EUN || align=right | 3.0 km || 
|-id=741 bgcolor=#d6d6d6
| 51741 Davidixon ||  ||  || May 24, 2001 || Anza || M. Collins, M. White || — || align=right | 7.4 km || 
|-id=742 bgcolor=#fefefe
| 51742 ||  || — || May 22, 2001 || Socorro || LINEAR || — || align=right | 2.6 km || 
|-id=743 bgcolor=#E9E9E9
| 51743 ||  || — || May 22, 2001 || Socorro || LINEAR || — || align=right | 3.3 km || 
|-id=744 bgcolor=#E9E9E9
| 51744 ||  || — || May 23, 2001 || Socorro || LINEAR || — || align=right | 3.0 km || 
|-id=745 bgcolor=#E9E9E9
| 51745 ||  || — || May 26, 2001 || Socorro || LINEAR || — || align=right | 5.0 km || 
|-id=746 bgcolor=#E9E9E9
| 51746 ||  || — || May 18, 2001 || Kitt Peak || Spacewatch || — || align=right | 4.8 km || 
|-id=747 bgcolor=#fefefe
| 51747 ||  || — || May 20, 2001 || Haleakala || NEAT || — || align=right | 2.3 km || 
|-id=748 bgcolor=#E9E9E9
| 51748 ||  || — || May 21, 2001 || Socorro || LINEAR || — || align=right | 4.2 km || 
|-id=749 bgcolor=#E9E9E9
| 51749 ||  || — || May 22, 2001 || Anderson Mesa || LONEOS || MAR || align=right | 3.5 km || 
|-id=750 bgcolor=#fefefe
| 51750 ||  || — || May 22, 2001 || Socorro || LINEAR || FLO || align=right | 1.9 km || 
|-id=751 bgcolor=#d6d6d6
| 51751 ||  || — || May 23, 2001 || Haleakala || NEAT || — || align=right | 11 km || 
|-id=752 bgcolor=#E9E9E9
| 51752 ||  || — || May 21, 2001 || Socorro || LINEAR || — || align=right | 2.3 km || 
|-id=753 bgcolor=#E9E9E9
| 51753 ||  || — || May 24, 2001 || Socorro || LINEAR || — || align=right | 3.1 km || 
|-id=754 bgcolor=#fefefe
| 51754 ||  || — || May 24, 2001 || Kitt Peak || Spacewatch || — || align=right | 1.9 km || 
|-id=755 bgcolor=#E9E9E9
| 51755 ||  || — || June 13, 2001 || Socorro || LINEAR || — || align=right | 9.9 km || 
|-id=756 bgcolor=#E9E9E9
| 51756 ||  || — || June 13, 2001 || Socorro || LINEAR || — || align=right | 3.0 km || 
|-id=757 bgcolor=#d6d6d6
| 51757 ||  || — || June 13, 2001 || Socorro || LINEAR || — || align=right | 5.7 km || 
|-id=758 bgcolor=#fefefe
| 51758 ||  || — || June 13, 2001 || Socorro || LINEAR || V || align=right | 2.2 km || 
|-id=759 bgcolor=#E9E9E9
| 51759 ||  || — || June 14, 2001 || Palomar || NEAT || — || align=right | 2.6 km || 
|-id=760 bgcolor=#d6d6d6
| 51760 ||  || — || June 15, 2001 || Socorro || LINEAR || — || align=right | 11 km || 
|-id=761 bgcolor=#d6d6d6
| 51761 ||  || — || June 15, 2001 || Socorro || LINEAR || — || align=right | 15 km || 
|-id=762 bgcolor=#E9E9E9
| 51762 ||  || — || June 15, 2001 || Palomar || NEAT || MAR || align=right | 3.0 km || 
|-id=763 bgcolor=#d6d6d6
| 51763 ||  || — || June 15, 2001 || Palomar || NEAT || 7:4 || align=right | 11 km || 
|-id=764 bgcolor=#d6d6d6
| 51764 ||  || — || June 15, 2001 || Palomar || NEAT || LIX || align=right | 11 km || 
|-id=765 bgcolor=#E9E9E9
| 51765 ||  || — || June 15, 2001 || Socorro || LINEAR || MAR || align=right | 3.3 km || 
|-id=766 bgcolor=#E9E9E9
| 51766 ||  || — || June 15, 2001 || Socorro || LINEAR || — || align=right | 5.5 km || 
|-id=767 bgcolor=#d6d6d6
| 51767 ||  || — || June 11, 2001 || Kitt Peak || Spacewatch || EOS || align=right | 6.1 km || 
|-id=768 bgcolor=#E9E9E9
| 51768 ||  || — || June 14, 2001 || Kitt Peak || Spacewatch || — || align=right | 3.6 km || 
|-id=769 bgcolor=#d6d6d6
| 51769 ||  || — || June 15, 2001 || Socorro || LINEAR || — || align=right | 8.0 km || 
|-id=770 bgcolor=#E9E9E9
| 51770 ||  || — || June 15, 2001 || Socorro || LINEAR || — || align=right | 3.6 km || 
|-id=771 bgcolor=#d6d6d6
| 51771 || 2001 MH || — || June 16, 2001 || Desert Beaver || W. K. Y. Yeung || — || align=right | 5.5 km || 
|-id=772 bgcolor=#E9E9E9
| 51772 Sparker || 2001 MJ ||  || June 16, 2001 || Badlands || R. Dyvig || EUN || align=right | 4.2 km || 
|-id=773 bgcolor=#FA8072
| 51773 || 2001 MV || — || June 16, 2001 || Socorro || LINEAR || PHO || align=right | 3.3 km || 
|-id=774 bgcolor=#E9E9E9
| 51774 ||  || — || June 16, 2001 || Palomar || NEAT || ADE || align=right | 6.5 km || 
|-id=775 bgcolor=#d6d6d6
| 51775 ||  || — || June 16, 2001 || Palomar || NEAT || — || align=right | 15 km || 
|-id=776 bgcolor=#E9E9E9
| 51776 ||  || — || June 16, 2001 || Socorro || LINEAR || — || align=right | 2.4 km || 
|-id=777 bgcolor=#d6d6d6
| 51777 ||  || — || June 20, 2001 || Haleakala || NEAT || slow || align=right | 10 km || 
|-id=778 bgcolor=#E9E9E9
| 51778 ||  || — || June 17, 2001 || Palomar || NEAT || — || align=right | 3.9 km || 
|-id=779 bgcolor=#d6d6d6
| 51779 ||  || — || June 19, 2001 || Palomar || NEAT || KOR || align=right | 3.5 km || 
|-id=780 bgcolor=#d6d6d6
| 51780 ||  || — || June 20, 2001 || Palomar || NEAT || EOS || align=right | 4.9 km || 
|-id=781 bgcolor=#E9E9E9
| 51781 ||  || — || June 22, 2001 || Palomar || NEAT || MAR || align=right | 3.1 km || 
|-id=782 bgcolor=#E9E9E9
| 51782 ||  || — || June 21, 2001 || Palomar || NEAT || — || align=right | 5.2 km || 
|-id=783 bgcolor=#E9E9E9
| 51783 ||  || — || June 21, 2001 || Palomar || NEAT || — || align=right | 4.6 km || 
|-id=784 bgcolor=#E9E9E9
| 51784 ||  || — || June 23, 2001 || Palomar || NEAT || — || align=right | 8.2 km || 
|-id=785 bgcolor=#d6d6d6
| 51785 ||  || — || June 27, 2001 || Palomar || NEAT || — || align=right | 5.9 km || 
|-id=786 bgcolor=#d6d6d6
| 51786 ||  || — || June 29, 2001 || Anderson Mesa || LONEOS || — || align=right | 14 km || 
|-id=787 bgcolor=#fefefe
| 51787 ||  || — || June 22, 2001 || Palomar || NEAT || — || align=right | 4.2 km || 
|-id=788 bgcolor=#d6d6d6
| 51788 ||  || — || June 26, 2001 || Palomar || NEAT || KOR || align=right | 3.0 km || 
|-id=789 bgcolor=#d6d6d6
| 51789 ||  || — || June 26, 2001 || Palomar || NEAT || — || align=right | 6.6 km || 
|-id=790 bgcolor=#d6d6d6
| 51790 ||  || — || June 27, 2001 || Haleakala || NEAT || — || align=right | 17 km || 
|-id=791 bgcolor=#E9E9E9
| 51791 ||  || — || June 27, 2001 || Haleakala || NEAT || MAR || align=right | 4.2 km || 
|-id=792 bgcolor=#E9E9E9
| 51792 ||  || — || June 17, 2001 || Anderson Mesa || LONEOS || — || align=right | 5.9 km || 
|-id=793 bgcolor=#d6d6d6
| 51793 ||  || — || June 17, 2001 || Anderson Mesa || LONEOS || — || align=right | 5.6 km || 
|-id=794 bgcolor=#E9E9E9
| 51794 ||  || — || June 19, 2001 || Haleakala || NEAT || — || align=right | 4.0 km || 
|-id=795 bgcolor=#fefefe
| 51795 ||  || — || June 19, 2001 || Haleakala || NEAT || FLO || align=right | 1.9 km || 
|-id=796 bgcolor=#d6d6d6
| 51796 ||  || — || June 20, 2001 || Anderson Mesa || LONEOS || — || align=right | 9.2 km || 
|-id=797 bgcolor=#d6d6d6
| 51797 ||  || — || June 20, 2001 || Anderson Mesa || LONEOS || — || align=right | 7.8 km || 
|-id=798 bgcolor=#d6d6d6
| 51798 ||  || — || June 23, 2001 || Palomar || NEAT || — || align=right | 6.0 km || 
|-id=799 bgcolor=#d6d6d6
| 51799 ||  || — || June 27, 2001 || Anderson Mesa || LONEOS || — || align=right | 6.9 km || 
|-id=800 bgcolor=#E9E9E9
| 51800 ||  || — || July 13, 2001 || Palomar || NEAT || WIT || align=right | 2.6 km || 
|}

51801–51900 

|-bgcolor=#d6d6d6
| 51801 ||  || — || July 12, 2001 || Palomar || NEAT || URSslow || align=right | 9.9 km || 
|-id=802 bgcolor=#E9E9E9
| 51802 ||  || — || July 13, 2001 || Palomar || NEAT || — || align=right | 4.5 km || 
|-id=803 bgcolor=#E9E9E9
| 51803 ||  || — || July 13, 2001 || Palomar || NEAT || — || align=right | 3.7 km || 
|-id=804 bgcolor=#d6d6d6
| 51804 ||  || — || July 14, 2001 || Palomar || NEAT || THM || align=right | 5.4 km || 
|-id=805 bgcolor=#E9E9E9
| 51805 ||  || — || July 14, 2001 || Haleakala || NEAT || — || align=right | 3.2 km || 
|-id=806 bgcolor=#d6d6d6
| 51806 ||  || — || July 12, 2001 || Haleakala || NEAT || EOS || align=right | 5.1 km || 
|-id=807 bgcolor=#E9E9E9
| 51807 ||  || — || July 12, 2001 || Haleakala || NEAT || — || align=right | 4.2 km || 
|-id=808 bgcolor=#d6d6d6
| 51808 ||  || — || July 18, 2001 || Palomar || NEAT || — || align=right | 6.7 km || 
|-id=809 bgcolor=#d6d6d6
| 51809 ||  || — || July 18, 2001 || Palomar || NEAT || EOS || align=right | 4.2 km || 
|-id=810 bgcolor=#d6d6d6
| 51810 ||  || — || July 17, 2001 || Anderson Mesa || LONEOS || — || align=right | 5.0 km || 
|-id=811 bgcolor=#d6d6d6
| 51811 ||  || — || July 17, 2001 || Anderson Mesa || LONEOS || — || align=right | 10 km || 
|-id=812 bgcolor=#d6d6d6
| 51812 ||  || — || July 17, 2001 || Anderson Mesa || LONEOS || — || align=right | 7.3 km || 
|-id=813 bgcolor=#d6d6d6
| 51813 ||  || — || July 17, 2001 || Anderson Mesa || LONEOS || — || align=right | 6.9 km || 
|-id=814 bgcolor=#d6d6d6
| 51814 ||  || — || July 20, 2001 || Anderson Mesa || LONEOS || EOS || align=right | 9.4 km || 
|-id=815 bgcolor=#d6d6d6
| 51815 ||  || — || July 19, 2001 || Palomar || NEAT || EOS || align=right | 6.4 km || 
|-id=816 bgcolor=#d6d6d6
| 51816 ||  || — || July 21, 2001 || Palomar || NEAT || — || align=right | 5.1 km || 
|-id=817 bgcolor=#E9E9E9
| 51817 ||  || — || July 21, 2001 || Reedy Creek || J. Broughton || — || align=right | 3.4 km || 
|-id=818 bgcolor=#E9E9E9
| 51818 ||  || — || July 18, 2001 || Palomar || NEAT || MIT || align=right | 6.1 km || 
|-id=819 bgcolor=#E9E9E9
| 51819 ||  || — || July 19, 2001 || Palomar || NEAT || DOR || align=right | 6.2 km || 
|-id=820 bgcolor=#E9E9E9
| 51820 ||  || — || July 18, 2001 || Haleakala || NEAT || — || align=right | 2.2 km || 
|-id=821 bgcolor=#E9E9E9
| 51821 ||  || — || July 21, 2001 || Anderson Mesa || LONEOS || EUN || align=right | 5.2 km || 
|-id=822 bgcolor=#d6d6d6
| 51822 ||  || — || July 16, 2001 || Haleakala || NEAT || — || align=right | 9.1 km || 
|-id=823 bgcolor=#d6d6d6
| 51823 Rickhusband ||  ||  || July 18, 2001 || Palomar || NEAT || LIX || align=right | 8.7 km || 
|-id=824 bgcolor=#d6d6d6
| 51824 Mikeanderson ||  ||  || July 19, 2001 || Palomar || NEAT || EOS || align=right | 5.0 km || 
|-id=825 bgcolor=#d6d6d6
| 51825 Davidbrown ||  ||  || July 19, 2001 || Palomar || NEAT || EOS || align=right | 4.9 km || 
|-id=826 bgcolor=#d6d6d6
| 51826 Kalpanachawla ||  ||  || July 19, 2001 || Palomar || NEAT || EOS || align=right | 6.9 km || 
|-id=827 bgcolor=#d6d6d6
| 51827 Laurelclark ||  ||  || July 20, 2001 || Palomar || NEAT || — || align=right | 6.0 km || 
|-id=828 bgcolor=#E9E9E9
| 51828 Ilanramon ||  ||  || July 20, 2001 || Palomar || NEAT || GEF || align=right | 5.5 km || 
|-id=829 bgcolor=#fefefe
| 51829 Williemccool ||  ||  || July 21, 2001 || Palomar || NEAT || V || align=right | 2.0 km || 
|-id=830 bgcolor=#d6d6d6
| 51830 ||  || — || July 23, 2001 || Palomar || NEAT || — || align=right | 8.7 km || 
|-id=831 bgcolor=#d6d6d6
| 51831 ||  || — || July 23, 2001 || Haleakala || NEAT || — || align=right | 11 km || 
|-id=832 bgcolor=#d6d6d6
| 51832 ||  || — || July 16, 2001 || Anderson Mesa || LONEOS || — || align=right | 6.2 km || 
|-id=833 bgcolor=#E9E9E9
| 51833 ||  || — || July 16, 2001 || Anderson Mesa || LONEOS || EUN || align=right | 4.1 km || 
|-id=834 bgcolor=#d6d6d6
| 51834 ||  || — || July 16, 2001 || Anderson Mesa || LONEOS || EOS || align=right | 5.3 km || 
|-id=835 bgcolor=#d6d6d6
| 51835 ||  || — || July 21, 2001 || Palomar || NEAT || — || align=right | 4.9 km || 
|-id=836 bgcolor=#d6d6d6
| 51836 ||  || — || July 26, 2001 || Palomar || NEAT || 7:4 || align=right | 9.7 km || 
|-id=837 bgcolor=#d6d6d6
| 51837 ||  || — || July 21, 2001 || Haleakala || NEAT || — || align=right | 9.9 km || 
|-id=838 bgcolor=#d6d6d6
| 51838 ||  || — || July 21, 2001 || Haleakala || NEAT || 3:2 || align=right | 9.3 km || 
|-id=839 bgcolor=#d6d6d6
| 51839 ||  || — || July 22, 2001 || Palomar || NEAT || — || align=right | 5.8 km || 
|-id=840 bgcolor=#d6d6d6
| 51840 ||  || — || July 22, 2001 || Palomar || NEAT || — || align=right | 5.2 km || 
|-id=841 bgcolor=#E9E9E9
| 51841 ||  || — || July 23, 2001 || Reedy Creek || J. Broughton || ADE || align=right | 3.1 km || 
|-id=842 bgcolor=#E9E9E9
| 51842 ||  || — || July 16, 2001 || Haleakala || NEAT || EUN || align=right | 3.5 km || 
|-id=843 bgcolor=#d6d6d6
| 51843 ||  || — || July 27, 2001 || Palomar || NEAT || — || align=right | 7.6 km || 
|-id=844 bgcolor=#d6d6d6
| 51844 ||  || — || July 27, 2001 || Palomar || NEAT || CRO || align=right | 8.0 km || 
|-id=845 bgcolor=#d6d6d6
| 51845 ||  || — || July 27, 2001 || Palomar || NEAT || — || align=right | 8.0 km || 
|-id=846 bgcolor=#E9E9E9
| 51846 ||  || — || July 21, 2001 || Haleakala || NEAT || EUN || align=right | 3.8 km || 
|-id=847 bgcolor=#d6d6d6
| 51847 ||  || — || July 21, 2001 || Haleakala || NEAT || KOR || align=right | 4.9 km || 
|-id=848 bgcolor=#d6d6d6
| 51848 ||  || — || July 23, 2001 || Haleakala || NEAT || — || align=right | 9.8 km || 
|-id=849 bgcolor=#d6d6d6
| 51849 ||  || — || July 25, 2001 || Haleakala || NEAT || — || align=right | 5.9 km || 
|-id=850 bgcolor=#d6d6d6
| 51850 ||  || — || July 22, 2001 || Palomar || NEAT || — || align=right | 11 km || 
|-id=851 bgcolor=#d6d6d6
| 51851 ||  || — || July 24, 2001 || Palomar || NEAT || MEL || align=right | 11 km || 
|-id=852 bgcolor=#d6d6d6
| 51852 ||  || — || July 29, 2001 || Palomar || NEAT || ALA || align=right | 19 km || 
|-id=853 bgcolor=#d6d6d6
| 51853 ||  || — || July 25, 2001 || Haleakala || NEAT || EOS || align=right | 5.5 km || 
|-id=854 bgcolor=#d6d6d6
| 51854 ||  || — || July 27, 2001 || Anderson Mesa || LONEOS || — || align=right | 16 km || 
|-id=855 bgcolor=#E9E9E9
| 51855 ||  || — || July 28, 2001 || Haleakala || NEAT || EUN || align=right | 3.3 km || 
|-id=856 bgcolor=#E9E9E9
| 51856 ||  || — || July 29, 2001 || Anderson Mesa || LONEOS || — || align=right | 5.6 km || 
|-id=857 bgcolor=#E9E9E9
| 51857 ||  || — || July 28, 2001 || Anderson Mesa || LONEOS || EUN || align=right | 5.4 km || 
|-id=858 bgcolor=#d6d6d6
| 51858 ||  || — || July 29, 2001 || Socorro || LINEAR || — || align=right | 8.2 km || 
|-id=859 bgcolor=#d6d6d6
| 51859 ||  || — || July 30, 2001 || Socorro || LINEAR || HYG || align=right | 7.9 km || 
|-id=860 bgcolor=#d6d6d6
| 51860 ||  || — || July 30, 2001 || Socorro || LINEAR || — || align=right | 5.7 km || 
|-id=861 bgcolor=#d6d6d6
| 51861 || 2001 PD || — || August 1, 2001 || Palomar || NEAT || — || align=right | 5.4 km || 
|-id=862 bgcolor=#E9E9E9
| 51862 || 2001 PH || — || August 4, 2001 || Haleakala || NEAT || — || align=right | 8.0 km || 
|-id=863 bgcolor=#d6d6d6
| 51863 || 2001 PQ || — || August 6, 2001 || Palomar || NEAT || THM || align=right | 5.6 km || 
|-id=864 bgcolor=#E9E9E9
| 51864 || 2001 PW || — || August 2, 2001 || Haleakala || NEAT || PAD || align=right | 6.3 km || 
|-id=865 bgcolor=#d6d6d6
| 51865 ||  || — || August 3, 2001 || Haleakala || NEAT || 3:2 || align=right | 13 km || 
|-id=866 bgcolor=#fefefe
| 51866 ||  || — || August 4, 2001 || Haleakala || NEAT || — || align=right | 4.0 km || 
|-id=867 bgcolor=#E9E9E9
| 51867 ||  || — || August 5, 2001 || Palomar || NEAT || — || align=right | 4.9 km || 
|-id=868 bgcolor=#d6d6d6
| 51868 ||  || — || August 6, 2001 || Palomar || NEAT || — || align=right | 8.7 km || 
|-id=869 bgcolor=#d6d6d6
| 51869 ||  || — || August 5, 2001 || Palomar || NEAT || — || align=right | 4.6 km || 
|-id=870 bgcolor=#d6d6d6
| 51870 ||  || — || August 10, 2001 || Haleakala || NEAT || EOS || align=right | 5.8 km || 
|-id=871 bgcolor=#d6d6d6
| 51871 ||  || — || August 11, 2001 || Palomar || NEAT || VER || align=right | 8.1 km || 
|-id=872 bgcolor=#d6d6d6
| 51872 ||  || — || August 10, 2001 || Ametlla de Mar || J. Nomen || — || align=right | 11 km || 
|-id=873 bgcolor=#d6d6d6
| 51873 ||  || — || August 10, 2001 || Palomar || NEAT || — || align=right | 6.9 km || 
|-id=874 bgcolor=#d6d6d6
| 51874 ||  || — || August 15, 2001 || San Marcello || M. Tombelli, A. Boattini || 3:2 || align=right | 13 km || 
|-id=875 bgcolor=#d6d6d6
| 51875 ||  || — || August 10, 2001 || Palomar || NEAT || EOS || align=right | 7.6 km || 
|-id=876 bgcolor=#d6d6d6
| 51876 ||  || — || August 11, 2001 || Palomar || NEAT || 7:4 || align=right | 11 km || 
|-id=877 bgcolor=#d6d6d6
| 51877 ||  || — || August 12, 2001 || Palomar || NEAT || — || align=right | 9.0 km || 
|-id=878 bgcolor=#d6d6d6
| 51878 ||  || — || August 13, 2001 || Palomar || NEAT || URS || align=right | 8.0 km || 
|-id=879 bgcolor=#d6d6d6
| 51879 ||  || — || August 14, 2001 || Haleakala || NEAT || EOS || align=right | 6.7 km || 
|-id=880 bgcolor=#d6d6d6
| 51880 ||  || — || August 14, 2001 || Haleakala || NEAT || — || align=right | 7.3 km || 
|-id=881 bgcolor=#d6d6d6
| 51881 ||  || — || August 14, 2001 || Haleakala || NEAT || EOS || align=right | 5.9 km || 
|-id=882 bgcolor=#d6d6d6
| 51882 ||  || — || August 16, 2001 || Socorro || LINEAR || — || align=right | 7.3 km || 
|-id=883 bgcolor=#E9E9E9
| 51883 ||  || — || August 16, 2001 || Socorro || LINEAR || — || align=right | 3.7 km || 
|-id=884 bgcolor=#d6d6d6
| 51884 ||  || — || August 16, 2001 || Socorro || LINEAR || KOR || align=right | 4.6 km || 
|-id=885 bgcolor=#d6d6d6
| 51885 ||  || — || August 16, 2001 || Socorro || LINEAR || 3:2 || align=right | 11 km || 
|-id=886 bgcolor=#d6d6d6
| 51886 ||  || — || August 16, 2001 || Socorro || LINEAR || — || align=right | 12 km || 
|-id=887 bgcolor=#E9E9E9
| 51887 ||  || — || August 16, 2001 || Socorro || LINEAR || — || align=right | 3.6 km || 
|-id=888 bgcolor=#d6d6d6
| 51888 ||  || — || August 16, 2001 || Socorro || LINEAR || SHU3:2slow || align=right | 19 km || 
|-id=889 bgcolor=#d6d6d6
| 51889 ||  || — || August 16, 2001 || Socorro || LINEAR || HYG || align=right | 9.0 km || 
|-id=890 bgcolor=#d6d6d6
| 51890 ||  || — || August 16, 2001 || Socorro || LINEAR || ALA || align=right | 12 km || 
|-id=891 bgcolor=#d6d6d6
| 51891 ||  || — || August 16, 2001 || Socorro || LINEAR || KOR || align=right | 5.9 km || 
|-id=892 bgcolor=#d6d6d6
| 51892 ||  || — || August 16, 2001 || Socorro || LINEAR || — || align=right | 6.7 km || 
|-id=893 bgcolor=#d6d6d6
| 51893 ||  || — || August 16, 2001 || Socorro || LINEAR || — || align=right | 9.9 km || 
|-id=894 bgcolor=#d6d6d6
| 51894 ||  || — || August 16, 2001 || Socorro || LINEAR || HYG || align=right | 9.5 km || 
|-id=895 bgcolor=#d6d6d6
| 51895 Biblialexa ||  ||  || August 19, 2001 || Ondřejov || P. Pravec, P. Kušnirák || — || align=right | 4.8 km || 
|-id=896 bgcolor=#d6d6d6
| 51896 ||  || — || August 16, 2001 || Socorro || LINEAR || — || align=right | 3.7 km || 
|-id=897 bgcolor=#E9E9E9
| 51897 ||  || — || August 16, 2001 || Socorro || LINEAR || — || align=right | 6.2 km || 
|-id=898 bgcolor=#d6d6d6
| 51898 ||  || — || August 16, 2001 || Socorro || LINEAR || — || align=right | 8.9 km || 
|-id=899 bgcolor=#d6d6d6
| 51899 ||  || — || August 16, 2001 || Socorro || LINEAR || — || align=right | 5.6 km || 
|-id=900 bgcolor=#d6d6d6
| 51900 ||  || — || August 16, 2001 || Socorro || LINEAR || — || align=right | 5.9 km || 
|}

51901–52000 

|-bgcolor=#d6d6d6
| 51901 ||  || — || August 16, 2001 || Socorro || LINEAR || EOS || align=right | 5.0 km || 
|-id=902 bgcolor=#d6d6d6
| 51902 ||  || — || August 16, 2001 || Socorro || LINEAR || — || align=right | 7.9 km || 
|-id=903 bgcolor=#d6d6d6
| 51903 ||  || — || August 16, 2001 || Socorro || LINEAR || — || align=right | 6.4 km || 
|-id=904 bgcolor=#E9E9E9
| 51904 ||  || — || August 16, 2001 || Socorro || LINEAR || MAR || align=right | 3.1 km || 
|-id=905 bgcolor=#E9E9E9
| 51905 ||  || — || August 16, 2001 || Socorro || LINEAR || — || align=right | 4.8 km || 
|-id=906 bgcolor=#d6d6d6
| 51906 ||  || — || August 16, 2001 || Socorro || LINEAR || HYG || align=right | 8.4 km || 
|-id=907 bgcolor=#E9E9E9
| 51907 ||  || — || August 16, 2001 || Socorro || LINEAR || ADE || align=right | 5.5 km || 
|-id=908 bgcolor=#d6d6d6
| 51908 ||  || — || August 18, 2001 || Socorro || LINEAR || HYG || align=right | 7.4 km || 
|-id=909 bgcolor=#E9E9E9
| 51909 ||  || — || August 18, 2001 || Socorro || LINEAR || ADE || align=right | 6.6 km || 
|-id=910 bgcolor=#C2FFFF
| 51910 ||  || — || August 18, 2001 || Socorro || LINEAR || L5 || align=right | 26 km || 
|-id=911 bgcolor=#d6d6d6
| 51911 ||  || — || August 20, 2001 || Oakley || C. Wolfe || — || align=right | 12 km || 
|-id=912 bgcolor=#d6d6d6
| 51912 ||  || — || August 17, 2001 || Socorro || LINEAR || — || align=right | 12 km || 
|-id=913 bgcolor=#d6d6d6
| 51913 ||  || — || August 17, 2001 || Socorro || LINEAR || — || align=right | 8.4 km || 
|-id=914 bgcolor=#d6d6d6
| 51914 ||  || — || August 17, 2001 || Socorro || LINEAR || VER || align=right | 11 km || 
|-id=915 bgcolor=#E9E9E9
| 51915 Andry ||  ||  || August 20, 2001 || Colleverde || V. S. Casulli || ADE || align=right | 11 km || 
|-id=916 bgcolor=#d6d6d6
| 51916 ||  || — || August 16, 2001 || Socorro || LINEAR || — || align=right | 7.2 km || 
|-id=917 bgcolor=#E9E9E9
| 51917 ||  || — || August 17, 2001 || Socorro || LINEAR || — || align=right | 6.8 km || 
|-id=918 bgcolor=#d6d6d6
| 51918 ||  || — || August 19, 2001 || Socorro || LINEAR || — || align=right | 7.9 km || 
|-id=919 bgcolor=#d6d6d6
| 51919 ||  || — || August 16, 2001 || Palomar || NEAT || — || align=right | 16 km || 
|-id=920 bgcolor=#d6d6d6
| 51920 ||  || — || August 17, 2001 || Palomar || NEAT || URS || align=right | 15 km || 
|-id=921 bgcolor=#E9E9E9
| 51921 ||  || — || August 22, 2001 || Socorro || LINEAR || — || align=right | 10 km || 
|-id=922 bgcolor=#d6d6d6
| 51922 ||  || — || August 22, 2001 || Socorro || LINEAR || URS || align=right | 5.8 km || 
|-id=923 bgcolor=#d6d6d6
| 51923 ||  || — || August 22, 2001 || Kitt Peak || Spacewatch || KAR || align=right | 2.6 km || 
|-id=924 bgcolor=#d6d6d6
| 51924 ||  || — || August 16, 2001 || Socorro || LINEAR || — || align=right | 15 km || 
|-id=925 bgcolor=#E9E9E9
| 51925 ||  || — || August 19, 2001 || Socorro || LINEAR || — || align=right | 2.8 km || 
|-id=926 bgcolor=#d6d6d6
| 51926 ||  || — || August 19, 2001 || Socorro || LINEAR || — || align=right | 8.4 km || 
|-id=927 bgcolor=#d6d6d6
| 51927 ||  || — || August 19, 2001 || Socorro || LINEAR || — || align=right | 12 km || 
|-id=928 bgcolor=#d6d6d6
| 51928 ||  || — || August 19, 2001 || Socorro || LINEAR || VER || align=right | 7.3 km || 
|-id=929 bgcolor=#d6d6d6
| 51929 ||  || — || August 20, 2001 || Socorro || LINEAR || — || align=right | 6.4 km || 
|-id=930 bgcolor=#d6d6d6
| 51930 ||  || — || August 20, 2001 || Socorro || LINEAR || HIL3:2 || align=right | 16 km || 
|-id=931 bgcolor=#E9E9E9
| 51931 ||  || — || August 20, 2001 || Socorro || LINEAR || GEF || align=right | 3.6 km || 
|-id=932 bgcolor=#d6d6d6
| 51932 ||  || — || August 20, 2001 || Socorro || LINEAR || — || align=right | 6.9 km || 
|-id=933 bgcolor=#d6d6d6
| 51933 ||  || — || August 21, 2001 || Socorro || LINEAR || EOS || align=right | 5.1 km || 
|-id=934 bgcolor=#d6d6d6
| 51934 ||  || — || August 21, 2001 || Socorro || LINEAR || EOS || align=right | 7.2 km || 
|-id=935 bgcolor=#C2FFFF
| 51935 ||  || — || August 22, 2001 || Socorro || LINEAR || L5 || align=right | 23 km || 
|-id=936 bgcolor=#d6d6d6
| 51936 ||  || — || August 24, 2001 || Socorro || LINEAR || — || align=right | 6.8 km || 
|-id=937 bgcolor=#d6d6d6
| 51937 ||  || — || August 23, 2001 || Anderson Mesa || LONEOS || — || align=right | 8.3 km || 
|-id=938 bgcolor=#d6d6d6
| 51938 ||  || — || August 23, 2001 || Anderson Mesa || LONEOS || — || align=right | 11 km || 
|-id=939 bgcolor=#E9E9E9
| 51939 ||  || — || August 25, 2001 || Haleakala || NEAT || — || align=right | 3.7 km || 
|-id=940 bgcolor=#E9E9E9
| 51940 ||  || — || August 25, 2001 || Socorro || LINEAR || — || align=right | 4.5 km || 
|-id=941 bgcolor=#E9E9E9
| 51941 ||  || — || August 23, 2001 || Kitt Peak || Spacewatch || — || align=right | 4.4 km || 
|-id=942 bgcolor=#d6d6d6
| 51942 ||  || — || August 22, 2001 || Palomar || NEAT || — || align=right | 5.4 km || 
|-id=943 bgcolor=#d6d6d6
| 51943 ||  || — || August 28, 2001 || Palomar || NEAT || — || align=right | 14 km || 
|-id=944 bgcolor=#d6d6d6
| 51944 ||  || — || August 22, 2001 || Socorro || LINEAR || — || align=right | 10 km || 
|-id=945 bgcolor=#d6d6d6
| 51945 ||  || — || August 22, 2001 || Haleakala || NEAT || URS || align=right | 8.0 km || 
|-id=946 bgcolor=#d6d6d6
| 51946 ||  || — || August 23, 2001 || Anderson Mesa || LONEOS || — || align=right | 11 km || 
|-id=947 bgcolor=#d6d6d6
| 51947 ||  || — || August 23, 2001 || Anderson Mesa || LONEOS || EMA || align=right | 7.9 km || 
|-id=948 bgcolor=#E9E9E9
| 51948 ||  || — || August 23, 2001 || Anderson Mesa || LONEOS || — || align=right | 3.4 km || 
|-id=949 bgcolor=#d6d6d6
| 51949 ||  || — || August 23, 2001 || Kitt Peak || Spacewatch || EOS || align=right | 5.7 km || 
|-id=950 bgcolor=#d6d6d6
| 51950 ||  || — || August 24, 2001 || Anderson Mesa || LONEOS || EOS || align=right | 6.5 km || 
|-id=951 bgcolor=#d6d6d6
| 51951 ||  || — || August 24, 2001 || Anderson Mesa || LONEOS || — || align=right | 6.1 km || 
|-id=952 bgcolor=#d6d6d6
| 51952 ||  || — || August 24, 2001 || Anderson Mesa || LONEOS || EOS || align=right | 7.7 km || 
|-id=953 bgcolor=#d6d6d6
| 51953 ||  || — || August 24, 2001 || Socorro || LINEAR || HYG || align=right | 8.5 km || 
|-id=954 bgcolor=#d6d6d6
| 51954 ||  || — || August 24, 2001 || Haleakala || NEAT || — || align=right | 8.4 km || 
|-id=955 bgcolor=#d6d6d6
| 51955 ||  || — || August 24, 2001 || Haleakala || NEAT || — || align=right | 9.6 km || 
|-id=956 bgcolor=#E9E9E9
| 51956 ||  || — || August 25, 2001 || Socorro || LINEAR || EUN || align=right | 2.9 km || 
|-id=957 bgcolor=#d6d6d6
| 51957 ||  || — || August 25, 2001 || Socorro || LINEAR || — || align=right | 8.0 km || 
|-id=958 bgcolor=#C2FFFF
| 51958 ||  || — || August 25, 2001 || Socorro || LINEAR || L5 || align=right | 27 km || 
|-id=959 bgcolor=#d6d6d6
| 51959 ||  || — || August 25, 2001 || Socorro || LINEAR || — || align=right | 19 km || 
|-id=960 bgcolor=#d6d6d6
| 51960 ||  || — || August 25, 2001 || Socorro || LINEAR || EOS || align=right | 6.1 km || 
|-id=961 bgcolor=#d6d6d6
| 51961 ||  || — || August 20, 2001 || Socorro || LINEAR || URS || align=right | 10 km || 
|-id=962 bgcolor=#C2FFFF
| 51962 ||  || — || August 20, 2001 || Palomar || NEAT || L5 || align=right | 27 km || 
|-id=963 bgcolor=#d6d6d6
| 51963 ||  || — || August 19, 2001 || Socorro || LINEAR || — || align=right | 11 km || 
|-id=964 bgcolor=#d6d6d6
| 51964 ||  || — || August 19, 2001 || Socorro || LINEAR || VER || align=right | 10 km || 
|-id=965 bgcolor=#d6d6d6
| 51965 ||  || — || August 19, 2001 || Socorro || LINEAR || EUP || align=right | 15 km || 
|-id=966 bgcolor=#d6d6d6
| 51966 ||  || — || August 19, 2001 || Anderson Mesa || LONEOS || URS || align=right | 12 km || 
|-id=967 bgcolor=#d6d6d6
| 51967 ||  || — || August 18, 2001 || Palomar || NEAT || — || align=right | 6.7 km || 
|-id=968 bgcolor=#E9E9E9
| 51968 ||  || — || August 31, 2001 || Palomar || NEAT || — || align=right | 5.2 km || 
|-id=969 bgcolor=#C2FFFF
| 51969 ||  || — || August 16, 2001 || Palomar || NEAT || L5 || align=right | 24 km || 
|-id=970 bgcolor=#d6d6d6
| 51970 ||  || — || September 8, 2001 || Anderson Mesa || LONEOS || — || align=right | 7.5 km || 
|-id=971 bgcolor=#d6d6d6
| 51971 ||  || — || September 8, 2001 || Socorro || LINEAR || — || align=right | 9.3 km || 
|-id=972 bgcolor=#d6d6d6
| 51972 ||  || — || September 7, 2001 || Socorro || LINEAR || THM || align=right | 9.5 km || 
|-id=973 bgcolor=#E9E9E9
| 51973 ||  || — || September 7, 2001 || Socorro || LINEAR || — || align=right | 3.8 km || 
|-id=974 bgcolor=#d6d6d6
| 51974 ||  || — || September 8, 2001 || Socorro || LINEAR || EOS || align=right | 6.5 km || 
|-id=975 bgcolor=#d6d6d6
| 51975 ||  || — || September 12, 2001 || Socorro || LINEAR || — || align=right | 7.9 km || 
|-id=976 bgcolor=#d6d6d6
| 51976 ||  || — || September 9, 2001 || Palomar || NEAT || — || align=right | 9.3 km || 
|-id=977 bgcolor=#d6d6d6
| 51977 ||  || — || September 12, 2001 || Socorro || LINEAR || EOS || align=right | 5.1 km || 
|-id=978 bgcolor=#d6d6d6
| 51978 ||  || — || September 12, 2001 || Socorro || LINEAR || — || align=right | 6.1 km || 
|-id=979 bgcolor=#d6d6d6
| 51979 ||  || — || September 9, 2001 || Palomar || NEAT || — || align=right | 5.3 km || 
|-id=980 bgcolor=#d6d6d6
| 51980 ||  || — || September 9, 2001 || Palomar || NEAT || EOS || align=right | 7.3 km || 
|-id=981 bgcolor=#d6d6d6
| 51981 ||  || — || September 10, 2001 || Anderson Mesa || LONEOS || — || align=right | 6.4 km || 
|-id=982 bgcolor=#d6d6d6
| 51982 ||  || — || September 11, 2001 || Anderson Mesa || LONEOS || — || align=right | 7.8 km || 
|-id=983 bgcolor=#d6d6d6
| 51983 Hönig ||  ||  || September 19, 2001 || Fountain Hills || C. W. Juels, P. R. Holvorcem || HIL3:2 || align=right | 15 km || 
|-id=984 bgcolor=#C2FFFF
| 51984 ||  || — || September 17, 2001 || Desert Eagle || W. K. Y. Yeung || L5 || align=right | 21 km || 
|-id=985 bgcolor=#d6d6d6
| 51985 Kirby ||  ||  || September 22, 2001 || Goodricke-Pigott || R. A. Tucker || — || align=right | 9.7 km || 
|-id=986 bgcolor=#d6d6d6
| 51986 ||  || — || September 16, 2001 || Socorro || LINEAR || EOS || align=right | 7.0 km || 
|-id=987 bgcolor=#d6d6d6
| 51987 ||  || — || September 19, 2001 || Socorro || LINEAR || KOR || align=right | 3.7 km || 
|-id=988 bgcolor=#fefefe
| 51988 ||  || — || September 25, 2001 || Desert Eagle || W. K. Y. Yeung || — || align=right | 2.5 km || 
|-id=989 bgcolor=#d6d6d6
| 51989 ||  || — || September 22, 2001 || Palomar || NEAT || ALA || align=right | 10 km || 
|-id=990 bgcolor=#d6d6d6
| 51990 ||  || — || September 22, 2001 || Palomar || NEAT || EOS || align=right | 7.2 km || 
|-id=991 bgcolor=#d6d6d6
| 51991 ||  || — || September 21, 2001 || Anderson Mesa || LONEOS || — || align=right | 11 km || 
|-id=992 bgcolor=#E9E9E9
| 51992 ||  || — || October 14, 2001 || Socorro || LINEAR || — || align=right | 4.9 km || 
|-id=993 bgcolor=#fefefe
| 51993 ||  || — || October 14, 2001 || Socorro || LINEAR || V || align=right | 2.1 km || 
|-id=994 bgcolor=#C2FFFF
| 51994 ||  || — || October 13, 2001 || Socorro || LINEAR || L5 || align=right | 20 km || 
|-id=995 bgcolor=#E9E9E9
| 51995 ||  || — || October 15, 2001 || Socorro || LINEAR || GEF || align=right | 3.7 km || 
|-id=996 bgcolor=#E9E9E9
| 51996 ||  || — || October 15, 2001 || Socorro || LINEAR || — || align=right | 6.8 km || 
|-id=997 bgcolor=#d6d6d6
| 51997 ||  || — || October 14, 2001 || Palomar || NEAT || EUP || align=right | 13 km || 
|-id=998 bgcolor=#d6d6d6
| 51998 ||  || — || October 15, 2001 || Socorro || LINEAR || — || align=right | 11 km || 
|-id=999 bgcolor=#d6d6d6
| 51999 ||  || — || October 17, 2001 || Socorro || LINEAR || — || align=right | 6.3 km || 
|-id=000 bgcolor=#d6d6d6
| 52000 ||  || — || October 18, 2001 || Socorro || LINEAR || — || align=right | 9.6 km || 
|}

References

External links 
 Discovery Circumstances: Numbered Minor Planets (50001)–(55000) (IAU Minor Planet Center)

0051